= List of mergers in Miyagi Prefecture =

Here is a list of mergers in Miyagi Prefecture, Japan since the Heisei era.

== Mergers from April 1, 1999 to Present ==
- On April 1, 2003 - the towns of Miyazaki, Nakaniida, and Onoda (all from Kami District) were merged to create the town of Kami.
- On April 1, 2005 - the towns of Naruse and Yamoto (both from Monou District) were merged to create the city of Higashimatsushima.
- On April 1, 2005 - the towns of Ichihasama, Kannari, Kurikoma, Semine, Shiwahime, Takashimizu, Tsukidate, Uguisuzawa and Wakayanagi, and the village of Hanayama (all from Kurihara District) was merged to create the city of Kurihara. Kurihara District was dissolved as a result of this merger.
- On April 1, 2005 - the towns of Hasama, Ishikoshi, Minamikata, Nakada, Toyoma, Towa, Toyosato and Yoneyama (all from Tome District), and the town of Tsuyama (from Motoyoshi District), were merged to create the city of Tome. Tome District was dissolved as a result of this merger.
- On April 1, 2005 - the old city of Ishinomaki absorbed the towns of Kahoku, Kanan, Kitakami, Monou and Ogatsu (all from Monou District), and the town of Oshika (from Oshika District) to create the new and expanded city of Ishinomaki. Monou District was dissolved as a result of this merger.
- On October 1, 2005 - the towns of Shizugawa and Utatsu (both from the Motoyoshi District) were merged to create the town of Minamisanriku.
- On January 1, 2006 - the towns of Kogota and Nangō (both from Tōda District) were merged to create the town of Misato.
- On March 31, 2006 - the old city of Kesennuma absorbed the town of Karakuwa (from Motoyoshi District) to create the new and expanded city of Kesennuma.
- On March 31, 2006 - the city of Furukawa absorbed the towns of Iwadeyama and Naruko (both from Tamatsukuri District), the towns of Kashimadai, Matsuyama and Sanbongi (all from Shida District), and the town of Tajiri (from Tōda District) to create the city of Ōsaki. Tamatsukuri District and Shida District were both dissolved as a result of this merger.
- On September 1, 2009 - the town of Motoyoshi (from Motoyoshi District) was merged into the expanded city of Kesennuma.
