= List of dialing codes in Japan =

Map of geographic dialing codes

These tables list the dialing codes (area codes) for calling land lines for various cities and districts in Japan, when dialing from within Japan. The leading 0 is omitted when calling from outside Japan. Cell phones use the dialing codes of 070, 080 or 090. IP-based phone services use the 050 dialing code.

Country Code:	+81
International Call Prefix:	010
Trunk Prefix:	0

== Aichi ==
Aichi District, Aichi	052
Aichi District, Aichi	0561
Aichi District, Aichi	05613
Aichi District, Aichi	05617
Ama District, Aichi	052
Ama District, Aichi	0567
Ama District, Aichi	05675
Ama District, Aichi	05679
Anjo, Aichi	0566
Atsumi District, Aichi	05312
Atsumi District, Aichi	05313
Atsumi District, Aichi	053145
Chiryu, Aichi	0566
Chita District, Aichi	0562
Chita District, Aichi	0569
Chita, Aichi	0562
Chita, Aichi	0569
Gamagori, Aichi	0533
Haguri District, Aichi	0586
Handa, Aichi	0569
Hekinan, Aichi	0566
Higashikamo District, Aichi	0564
Higashikamo District, Aichi	0565
Hoi District, Aichi	0533
Ichinomiya, Aichi	0586
Inazawa, Aichi	0586
Inazawa, Aichi	0587
Inuyama, Aichi	0568
Iwakura, Aichi	0587
Kariya, Aichi	0566
Kasugai, Aichi	0568
Kitashitara District, Aichi	05366
Kitashitara District, Aichi	05367
Kitashitara District, Aichi	05368
Kitashitara District, Aichi	053683
Komaki, Aichi	0568
Konan, Aichi	0587
Minamishitara District, Aichi	05363
Nagoya, Aichi	052
Nakashima District, Aichi	0567
Nakashima District, Aichi	0587
Nishikamo District, Aichi	05613
Nishikamo District, Aichi	0565
Nishikasugai District, Aichi	052
Nishikasugai District, Aichi	0568
Nishio, Aichi hazu District, Aichi	0563
Nishio, Aichi	0586
Nisshin, Aichi	052
Nisshin, Aichi	05617
Niwa District, Aichi	0587
Nukata District, Aichi	0564
Obu, Aichi	0562
Okazaki, Aichi	0564
Owariasahi, Aichi	052
Owariasahi, Aichi	0561
Seto, Aichi	0561
Seto, Aichi	0568
Shinshiro, Aichi	05362
Takahama, Aichi	0566
Tōkai, Aichi	052
Tōkai, Aichi	0562
Tokoname, Aichi	0569
Toyoake, Aichi	052
Toyoake, Aichi	0562
Toyohashi, Aichi	0532
Toyokawa, Aichi	0533
Toyota, Aichi	0565
Tsushima, Aichi	0567

== Akita ==
Akita, Akita	0188
Hiraka District, Akita	0182
Honjo, Akita	0184
Kawabe District, Akita	0188
Kazuno District, Akita	0176
Kazuno, Akita	0186
Kitaakita District, Akita	0186
Minamiakita District, Akita	0185
Minamiakita District, Akita	0188
Noshiro, Akita	0185
Oga, Akita	0185
Ogachi District, Akita	0182
Ogachi District, Akita	0183
Ōdate, Akita	0186
Omagari, Akita	0187
Senboku District, Akita	0182
Senboku District, Akita	0187
Senboku District, Akita	0188
Yamamoto District, Akita	0185
Yokote, Akita	0182
Yuri District, Akita	0184
Yuzawa, Akita	0183

== Aomori ==
Aomori District, Aomori	0172
Aomori, Aomori	0177
Goshogawara, Aomori	0173
Hachinohe, Aomori	0178
Higashitsugaru District, Aomori	0174
Higashitsugaru District, Aomori	0177
Hirosaki, Aomori	0172
Kamikita District, Aomori	0176
Kamikita District, Aomori	0178
Kitatsugaru District, Aomori	0172
Kitatsugaru District, Aomori	0173
Kuroishi, Aomori	0172
Minamitsugaru District, Aomori	0172
Mutsu, Aomori	0175
Nakatsugaru District, Aomori	0172
Nishitsugaru District, Aomori	0173
Sannohe District, Aomori	0176
Sannohe District, Aomori	0178
Sannohe District, Aomori	0179
Shimokita District, Aomori	0175
Towada, Aomori	0176

== Chiba ==
Abiko, Chiba	0471
Asahi, Chiba	0479
Awa District, Chiba	0470
Chiba, Chiba	043
Chiba, Chiba	0434
Chiba, Chiba	0474
Chōsei District, Chiba	0475
Chōshi, Chiba	0479
Funabashi, Chiba	047
Funabashi, Chiba	0474
Futtsu, Chiba	0439
Higashikatsushika District, Chiba	047
Higashikatsushika District, Chiba	0471
Ichihara, Chiba	043
Ichihara, Chiba	0436
Ichikawa, Chiba	047
Inba District, Chiba	043
Inba District, Chiba	0474
Inba District, Chiba	0476
Inzai, Chiba	0476
Isumi District, Chiba	0470
Kaijo District, Chiba	0479
Kamagaya, Chiba	047
Kamagaya, Chiba	0474
Kamogawa, Chiba	0470
Kashiwa, Chiba	0471
Katori District, Chiba	0476
Katori District, Chiba	0478
Katori District, Chiba	0479
Katsuura, Chiba	0470
Kimitsu, Chiba	0439
Kisarazu, Chiba	0438
Matsudo, Chiba	047
Mobara, Chiba	0475
Nagareyama, Chiba	0471
Narashino, Chiba	0474
Narita, Chiba	0476
Noda, Chiba	0471
Sakura, Chiba	043
Sanbu District, Chiba	043
Sanbu District, Chiba	0475
Sanbu District, Chiba	0479
Sawara, Chiba	0478
Sodegaura, Chiba	0438
Sōsa District, Chiba	0479
Tateyama, Chiba	0470
Urayasu, Chiba	047
Yachimata, Chiba	043
Yachiyo, Chiba	0474
Yōkaichiba, Chiba	0479
Yotsukaidō, Chiba	043

== Ehime ==
Higashiuwa District, Ehime	0894
Hōjō, Ehime	089
Imabari, Ehime	0898
Iyo District, Ehime	089
Iyo, Ehime	089
Iyomishima, Ehime	0896
Kamiukena District, Ehime	089
Kamiukena District, Ehime	0892
Kawanoe, Ehime	0896
Kita District, Ehime	0893
Kitauwa District, Ehime	0895
Matsuyama, Ehime	089
Minamiuwa District, Ehime	0895
Niihama, Ehime	0897
Nishiuwa District, Ehime	0894
Ochi District, Ehime	0897
Ochi District, Ehime	0898
Ōzu, Ehime	0893
Onsen District, Ehime	089
Saijō, Ehime	0897
Shūsō District, Ehime	0897
Shūsō District, Ehime	0898
Tōyo, Ehime	0898
Uma District, Ehime	0896
Uma District, Ehime	0897
Uwajima, Ehime	0895
Yawatahama, Ehime	0894

== Fukui ==
Asuwa District, Fukui	07797
Fukui, Fukui	0776
Imadate District, Fukui	0778
Katsuyama, Fukui	0779
Mikata District, Fukui	0770
Nanjō District, Fukui	0778
Nyū District, Fukui	0776
Nyū District, Fukui	0778
Obama, Fukui	0770
Ōi District, Fukui	0770
Ōno District, Fukui	0779
Ono, Fukui	0779
Onyu District, Fukui	0770
Sabae, Fukui	0778
Sakai District, Fukui	0776
Takefu, Fukui	0778
Tsuruga, Fukui	0770
Yoshida District, Fukui	0776
Yoshida District, Fukui	0779

== Fukuoka ==
Amagi, Fukuoka	0946
Asakura District, Fukuoka	092
Asakura District, Fukuoka	09437
Asakura District, Fukuoka	0946
Buzen, Fukuoka	0979
Chikugo, Fukuoka	0942
Chikugo, Fukuoka	0944
Chikujō District, Fukuoka	09305
Chikujō District, Fukuoka	0979
Chikushi District, Fukuoka	092
Chikushino, Fukuoka	092
Dazaifu, Fukuoka	092
Fukuoka, Fukuoka	092
Fukutsu, Fukuoka	0940
Iizuka, Fukuoka	0948
Iizuka, Fukuoka	09496
Itoshima District, Fukuoka	092
Kaho District, Fukuoka	0948
Kaho District, Fukuoka	09496
Kasuga, Fukuoka	092
Kasuya District, Fukuoka	092
Kitakyushu, Fukuoka	093
Koga, Fukuoka	092
Kurate District, Fukuoka	09492
Kurate District, Fukuoka	09493
Kurume, Fukuoka	0942
Maebaru, Fukuoka	092
Mii District, Fukuoka	0942
Miike District, Fukuoka	0944
akeako District, Fukuoka	093
Miyako District, Fukuoka	09302
Miyako District, Fukuoka	093032
Miyako District, Fukuoka	093033
Miyako District, Fukuoka	09304
Miyama, Fukuoka	0942
Miyama, Fukuoka	0944
Mizuma District, Fukuoka	0942
Mizuma District, Fukuoka	0944
Munakata, Fukuoka	0940
Nakama, Fukuoka	093
Nogata, Fukuoka	0947
Nogata, Fukuoka	09492
Ogori, Fukuoka	092
Ogori, Fukuoka	0942
Okawa, Fukuoka	0944
Omuta, Fukuoka	0944
Onojo, Fukuoka	092
Onga District, Fukuoka	093
Tagawa District, Fukuoka	0947
Tagawa, Fukuoka	0947
Ukiha District, Fukuoka	09437
Ukiha District, Fukuoka	0946
Yamada, Fukuoka	0948
Yame District, Fukuoka	0942
Yame District, Fukuoka	0943
Yame, Fukuoka	0943
Yanagawa, Fukuoka	0944
Yukuhashi, Fukuoka	0930

== Fukushima ==
Adachi District, Fukushima	024
Adachi District, Fukushima	0243
Aizuwakamatsu, Fukushima	0242
Date District, Fukushima	024
Fukushima, Fukushima	024
Fukushima, Fukushima	0242
Fukushima, Fukushima	0243
Futaba District, Fukushima	0240
Haramachi, Fukushima	0244
Higashishirakawa District, Fukushima	0247
Ishikawa District, Fukushima	0247
Iwaki, Fukushima	0246
Iwase District, Fukushima	0248
Kawanuma District, Fukushima	0241
Kawanuma District, Fukushima	0242
Kitaaizu District, Fukushima	0242
Kitakata, Fukushima	0241
Kōriyama, Fukushima	0249
Minamiaizu District, Fukushima	0241
Nihonmatsu, Fukushima	0243
Nishishirakawa District, Fukushima	0248
Ōnuma District, Fukushima	0241
Ōnuma District, Fukushima	0242
Shirakawa, Fukushima	0248
Sōma District, Fukushima	0244
Souma, Fukushima	0244
Sukagawa, Fukushima	0248
Sukagawa, Fukushima	0249
Tamura District, Fukushima	0247
Tamura District, Fukushima	0249
Yama District, Fukushima	0241
Yama District, Fukushima	0242

== Gifu ==
Anpachi District, Gifu	0584
Anpachi District, Gifu	0585
Ena District, Gifu	0572
Ena District, Gifu	0573
Ena, Gifu	0573
Fuwa District, Gifu	0584
Gifu, Gifu	058
Gujo District, Gifu	0575
Hashima District, Gifu	058
Hashima District, Gifu	058689
Hashima, Gifu	058
Ibi District, Gifu	058139
Ibi District, Gifu	0584
Ibi District, Gifu	0585
Kaizu District, Gifu	0584
Kakamigahara, Gifu	0583
Kamo District, Gifu	0574
Kamo District, Gifu	05747
Kani District, Gifu	0574
Kani, Gifu	0574
Mashita District, Gifu	0576
Mino, Gifu	0575
Minokamo, Gifu	0574
Mizunami, Gifu	0572
Mizunami, Gifu	0573
Mizunami, Gifu	0574
Motosu District, Gifu	058
Motosu District, Gifu	0581
Motosu District, Gifu	058138
Motosu District, Gifu	0584
Motosu District, Gifu	0585
Mugi District, Gifu	0575
Mugi District, Gifu	058157
Mugi District, Gifu	058158
Nakatsugawa, Gifu	0573
Ogaki, Gifu	0584
Ōno District, Gifu	0576
Ōno District, Gifu	05769
Ōno District, Gifu	0577
Ōno District, Gifu	0763
Seki, Gifu	0575
Tajimi, Gifu	0572
Takayama, Gifu	0577
Toki District, Gifu	0572
Toki, Gifu	0572
Yamagata District, Gifu	0581
Yoro District, Gifu	0584
Yoshiki District, Gifu	0577
Yoshiki District, Gifu	0578

== Gunma ==
Agatsuma District, Gunma	0267
Agatsuma District, Gunma	0279
Agatsuma District, Gunma	0287
Annaka, Gunma	0267
Fujioka, Gunma	0274
Gunma District, Gunma	0267
Isesaki, Gunma	0270
Kanra District, Gunma	0267
Kanra District, Gunma	0274
Kiryū, Gunma	0277
Kitagunma District, Gunma	027
Kitagunma District, Gunma	0279
Maebashi, Gunma	027
Nitta District, Gunma	0276
Nitta District, Gunma	0277
Nitta District, Gunma	0485
Numata, Gunma	0278
Ohta, Gunma	0276
Ohta, Gunma	0284
Ōra District, Gunma	0276
Sawa District, Gunma	0270
Seta District, Gunma	027
Seta District, Gunma	0277
Seta District, Gunma	0279
Shibukawa, Gunma	0279
Takasaki, Gunma	027
Tano District, Gunma	027
Tano District, Gunma	0274
Tatebayashi, Gunma	0276
Tomioka, Gunma	0274
Tone District, Gunma	0278
Usui District, Gunma	0267
Usui District, Gunma	0273
Yamada District, Gunma	0277

== Hiroshima ==
Aki District, Hiroshima	082
Aki District, Hiroshima	0823
Ashina District, Hiroshima	0847
Fuchuu, Hiroshima	0847
Fukayasu District, Hiroshima	0849
Fukuyama, Hiroshima	0847
Fukuyama, Hiroshima	0849
Futami District, Hiroshima	0824
Hatsukaichi, Hiroshima	082
Hiba District, Hiroshima	08248
Hiba District, Hiroshima	082485
Hiba District, Hiroshima	082486
Hiba District, Hiroshima	08477
Higashihiroshima, Hiroshima	0824
Hiroshima, Hiroshima	082
Innoshima, Hiroshima	08452
Jinseki District, Hiroshima	08478
Kamo District, Hiroshima	0823
Kamo District, Hiroshima	0824
Kamo District, Hiroshima	08473
Kōnu District, Hiroshima	082488
Kōnu District, Hiroshima	084762
Kōnu District, Hiroshima	084767
Kure, Hiroshima	0823
Mihara, Hiroshima	0848
Mitsugi District, Hiroshima	084732
Mitsugi District, Hiroshima	0848
Mitsugi District, Hiroshima	08487
Miyoshi, Hiroshima	0824
Miyoshi, Hiroshima	0826
Numakuma District, Hiroshima	0849
Ōtake, Hiroshima	08275
Onomichi, Hiroshima	0848
Saeki District, Hiroshima	0823
Saeki District, Hiroshima	08262
Saeki District, Hiroshima	08275
Saeki District, Hiroshima	0829
Sera District, Hiroshima	08472
Sera District, Hiroshima	08473
Shōbara, Hiroshima	08247
Shōbara, Hiroshima	082488
Takata District, Hiroshima	0824
Takata District, Hiroshima	0826
Takehara, Hiroshima	0846
Toyota District, Hiroshima	0823
Toyota District, Hiroshima	0824
Toyota District, Hiroshima	08452
Toyota District, Hiroshima	0846
Toyota District, Hiroshima	08466
Toyota District, Hiroshima	084732
Toyota District, Hiroshima	0848
Yamagata District, Hiroshima	0826
Yamagata District, Hiroshima	08262

== Hokkaidō ==
Abashiri District, Hokkaidō	0152
Abashiri District, Hokkaidō	01527
Abuta District, Hokkaidō	0136
Abuta District, Hokkaidō	0142
Akabira, Hokkaidō	0125
Akan District, Hokkaidō	0154
Akkeshi District, Hokkaidō	0153
Asahikawa, Hokkaidō	0166
Ashibetsu, Hokkaidō	01242
Ashibetsu, Hokkaidō	0167
Ashoro District, Hokkaidō	01562
Atsuta District, Hokkaidō	0133
Atsuta District, Hokkaidō	01337
Bibai, Hokkaidō	01266
Chitose, Hokkaidō	0123
Chitose, Hokkaidō	01452
Date, Hokkaidō	0142
Ebetsu, Hokkaidō	011
Eniwa, Hokkaidō	0123
Esashi District, Hokkaidō	01634
Esashi District, Hokkaidō	01636
Fukagawa, Hokkaidō	0164
Furano, Hokkaidō	0167
Furuu District, Hokkaidō	0135
Hakodate, Hokkaidō	0138
Hamamasu District, Hokkaidō	013379
Hiroo District, Hokkaidō	01558
Hiyama District, Hokkaidō	01395
Hiyama District, Hokkaidō	01396
Horoizumi District, Hokkaidō	01466
Ishikari District, Hokkaidō	0126
Ishikari District, Hokkaidō	0133
Ishikari District, Hokkaidō	01332
Ishikari, Hokkaidō	0133
Isoya District, Hokkaidō	0136
Iwamizawa, Hokkaidō	0126
Iwamizawa, Hokkaidō	01267
Iwanai District, Hokkaidō	0135
Kabato District, Hokkaidō	0125
Kabato District, Hokkaidō	0126
Kameda District, Hokkaidō	0138
Kamiiso District, Hokkaidō	0138
Kamiiso District, Hokkaidō	01392
Kamikawa District, Hokkaidō	01548
Kamikawa District, Hokkaidō	01566
Kamikawa District, Hokkaidō	016528
Kamikawa District, Hokkaidō	016532
Kamikawa District, Hokkaidō	016534
Kamikawa District, Hokkaidō	01655
Kamikawa District, Hokkaidō	01658
Kamikawa District, Hokkaidō	0166
Kasai District, Hokkaidō	0155
Katō District, Hokkaidō	0155
Katō District, Hokkaidō	01564
Katō District, Hokkaidō	01566
Kayabe District, Hokkaidō	01372
Kayabe District, Hokkaidō	01374
Kitahiroshima, Hokkaidō	011
Kitami, Hokkaidō	0157
Kudō District, Hokkaidō	01398
Kushiro District, Hokkaidō	0154
Kushiro, Hokkaidō	0154
Mashike District, Hokkaidō	0164
Matsumae District, Hokkaidō	01394
Menashi District, Hokkaidō	01538
Mikasa, Hokkaidō	01267
Mitsuishi District, Hokkaidō	01463
Monbetsu District, Hokkaidō	015829
Monbetsu District, Hokkaidō	01584
Monbetsu District, Hokkaidō	01586
Monbetsu District, Hokkaidō	01587
Monbetsu District, Hokkaidō	01588
Monbetsu, Hokkaidō	01582
Muroran, Hokkaidō	0143
Nakagawa District, Hokkaidō	0155
Nakagawa District, Hokkaidō	01557
Nakagawa District, Hokkaidō	01562
Nakagawa District, Hokkaidō	01656
Nayoro, Hokkaidō	01654
Nemuro, Hokkaidō	01532
Niikappu District, Hokkaidō	01456
Niikappu District, Hokkaidō	01464
Nishi District, Hokkaidō	01396
Nishi District, Hokkaidō	01398
Noboribetsu, Hokkaidō	0143
Notsuke District, Hokkaidō	01537
Notsuke District, Hokkaidō	01538
Obihiro, Hokkaidō	0155
Okushiri District, Hokkaidō	01397
Otaru, Hokkaidō	0133
Otaru, Hokkaidō	0134
Rebun District, Hokkaidō	01638
Rishiri District, Hokkaidō	01638
Rumoi District, Hokkaidō	01645
Rumoi, Hokkaidō	0164
Samani District, Hokkaidō	01463
Sapporo, Hokkaidō	011
Saru District, Hokkaidō	01456
Saru District, Hokkaidō	01457
Setana District, Hokkaidō	01378
Shakotan District, Hokkaidō	0135
Shari District, Hokkaidō	0152
Shari District, Hokkaidō	01522
Shibetsu District, Hokkaidō	01538
Shibetsu, Hokkaidō	01652
Shibetsu District, Hokkaidō	01537
Shimamaki District, Hokkaidō	0136
Shiranuka District, Hokkaidō	01547
Shiraoi District, Hokkaidō	0144
Shizunai District, Hokkaidō	01464
Sorachi District, Hokkaidō	011
Sorachi District, Hokkaidō	0125
Sorachi District, Hokkaidō	0126
Sorachi District, Hokkaidō	0167
Sōya District, Hokkaidō	01635
Sunagawa, Hokkaidō	0125
Suttsu District, Hokkaidō	0136
Takikawa, Hokkaidō	0125
Teshio District, Hokkaidō	0162
Teshio District, Hokkaidō	01632
Tokachi District, Hokkaidō	01557
Tokoro District, Hokkaidō	0152
Tokoro District, Hokkaidō	0157
Tomakomai, Hokkaidō	0123
Tomakomai, Hokkaidō	0144
Tomakomai, Hokkaidō	01452
Tomamae District, Hokkaidō	01646
Tomamae District, Hokkaidō	01648
Urakawa District, Hokkaidō	01462
Urakawa District, Hokkaidō	01463
Uryū District, Hokkaidō	0125
Uryū District, Hokkaidō	0164
Uryū District, Hokkaidō	01653
Usu District, Hokkaidō	0136
Usu District, Hokkaidō	0142
Utashinai, Hokkaidō	0125
Wakkanai, Hokkaidō	0162
Wakkanai, Hokkaidō	01635
Yamakoshi District, Hokkaidō	01376
Yamakoshi District, Hokkaidō	01377
Yoichi District, Hokkaidō	0135
Yūbari District, Hokkaidō	01237
Yūbari District, Hokkaidō	01238
Yūbari, Hokkaidō	01235
Yūbari, Hokkaidō	01237
Yūfutsu District, Hokkaidō	01452
Yūfutsu District, Hokkaidō	01454
Yūfutsu District, Hokkaidō	0167

== Hyōgo ==
Aioi, Hyōgo	07912
Akashi, Hyōgo	078
Akō District, Hyōgo	07915
Ako, Hyōgo	07914
Amagasaki, Hyōgo	06
Asago District, Hyōgo	0796
Ashiya, Hyōgo	0797
Ashiya, Hyōgo	0798
Hikami District, Hyōgo	0795
Himeji, Hyōgo	0792
Ibo District, Hyōgo	0791
Ibo District, Hyōgo	0792
Ibo District, Hyōgo	07932
Itami, Hyōgo	06
Itami, Hyōgo	0727
Izushi District, Hyōgo	0796
Kako District, Hyōgo	078
Kako District, Hyōgo	0794
Kako District, Hyōgo	0795
Kakogawa, Hyōgo	078
Kakogawa, Hyōgo	0794
Kanzaki District, Hyōgo	0790
Kanzaki District, Hyōgo	0792
Kasai, Hyōgo	0790
Kawabe District, Hyōgo	0727
Kawanishi, Hyōgo	0727
Kinosaki District, Hyōgo	0796
Kobe, Hyōgo	078
Kobe, Hyōgo	0797
Mihara District, Hyōgo	0799
Mikata District, Hyōgo	0796
Miki, Hyōgo	0794
Mino District, Hyōgo	0794
Nishinomiya, Hyōgo	078
Nishinomiya, Hyōgo	0797
Nishinomiya, Hyōgo	0798
Nishiwaki, Hyōgo	0795
Ono, Hyōgo	0794
Ono, Hyōgo	0795
Sanda, Hyōgo	0795
Sayō District, Hyōgo	0790
Shikama District, Hyōgo	07932
Shikama District, Hyōgo	07933
Shisō District, Hyōgo	0790
Sumoto, Hyōgo	0799
Taka District, Hyōgo	0795
Takarazuka, Hyōgo	0797
Takarazuka, Hyōgo	0798
Takarazuka, Hyōgo	0727
Takasago, Hyōgo	0794
Tatsuno, Hyōgo	0791
Toyooka, Hyōgo	0796
Tsuna District, Hyōgo	0799
Yabu District, Hyōgo	0796

== Ibaraki ==
Higashiibaraki District, Ibaraki	029
Higashiibaraki District, Ibaraki	02955
Hitachi, Ibaraki	0294
Hitachinaka, Ibaraki	029
Hitachiōta, Ibaraki	0294
Inashiki District, Ibaraki	0297
Inashiki District, Ibaraki	0298
Inashiki District, Ibaraki	0299
Ishioka, Ibaraki	0299
Iwai, Ibaraki	0297
Kasama, Ibaraki	0296
Kashima District, Ibaraki	0291
Kashima District, Ibaraki	0299
Kashima District, Ibaraki	0478
Kashima, Ibaraki	0299
Kitaibaraki, Ibaraki	0293
Kitasouma District, Ibaraki	0297
Koga, Ibaraki	0280
Kuji District, Ibaraki	0294
Kuji District, Ibaraki	02957
Makabe District, Ibaraki	0296
Mito, Ibaraki	029
Mitsukaido, Ibaraki	0297
Naka District, Ibaraki	029
Naka District, Ibaraki	0292
Naka District, Ibaraki	0294
Naka District, Ibaraki	02955
Namegata District, Ibaraki	0291
Namegata District, Ibaraki	0299
Namegata District, Ibaraki	0478
Niihari District, Ibaraki	0298
Niihari District, Ibaraki	0299
Nishiibaraki District, Ibaraki	0296
Nishiibaraki District, Ibaraki	0299
Ryūgasaki, Ibaraki	0297
Sashima District, Ibaraki	0280
Shimodate, Ibaraki	0296
Shimotsuma, Ibaraki	0296
Taga District, Ibaraki	0293
Takahagi, Ibaraki	0293
Toride, Ibaraki	0297
Toride, Ibaraki	0471
Tsuchiura, Ibaraki	0298
Tsukuba District, Ibaraki	0297
Tsukuba, Ibaraki	0298
Ushiku, Ibaraki	0298
Yūki District, Ibaraki	0296
Yūki District, Ibaraki	0297
Yuki, Ibaraki	0296

== Ishikawa ==
Enuma District, Ishikawa	07617
Fugeshi District, Ishikawa	0768
Hakui, Ishikawa	0766
Hakui, Ishikawa	0767
Ishikawa District, Ishikawa	076
Ishikawa District, Ishikawa	07619
Kaga, Ishikawa	07617
Kahoku District, Ishikawa	076
Kanazawa, Ishikawa	076
Kashima District, Ishikawa	0767
Komatsu, Ishikawa	0761
Matto, Ishikawa	076
Nanao, Ishikawa	0767
Nomi District, Ishikawa	076
Nomi District, Ishikawa	0761
Nomi District, Ishikawa	07619
Suzu District, Ishikawa	0768
Suzu, Ishikawa	0768
Wajima, Ishikawa	0768

== Iwate ==
Esashi, Iwate	0197
Hanamaki, Iwate	0198
Hienuki District, Iwate	0198
Ichinoseki, Iwate	0191
Isawa District, Iwate	0197
Iwate District, Iwate	019
Iwate District, Iwate	0195
Kamaishi, Iwate	0193
Kamihei District, Iwate	0193
Kamihei District, Iwate	0194
Kamihei District, Iwate	0198
Kesen District, Iwate	0191
Kesen District, Iwate	0192
Kesen District, Iwate	0197
Kitakami, Iwate	0197
Kuji, Iwate	0194
Kunohe District, Iwate	0194
Kunohe District, Iwate	0195
Miyako, Iwate	0193
Mizusawa, Iwate	0197
Morioka, Iwate	019
Ninohe District, Iwate	0195
Ninohe, Iwate	0195
Nishiiwai District, Iwate	0191
Ōfunato, Iwate	0192
Rikuzentakata, Iwate	0192
Shiwa District, Iwate	019
Tōno, Iwate	0198
Waga District, Iwate	0198
Waga District, Iwate	0197

== Kagawa ==
Ayauta District, Kagawa	087
Ayauta District, Kagawa	0877
Kagawa District, Kagawa	087
Kanonji, Kagawa	0875
Kita District, Kagawa	087
Marugame, Kagawa	0877
Mitoyo District, Kagawa	0875
Mitoyo District, Kagawa	0896
Nakatado District, Kagawa	0877
Okawa District, Kagawa	087
Okawa District, Kagawa	0879
Sakaide, Kagawa	0877
Shozu District, Kagawa	0879
Takamatsu, Kagawa	087
Zentsuji, Kagawa	0877

== Kagoshima ==
Aira District, Kagoshima	099
Aira District, Kagoshima	0995
Akune, Kagoshima	0996
Hioki District, Kagoshima	099
Hioki District, Kagoshima	0993
Hioki District, Kagoshima	0996
Ibusuki District, Kagoshima	0993
Ibusuki, Kagoshima	0993
Isa District, Kagoshima	09952
Izumi District, Kagoshima	0996
Izumi, Kagoshima	0996
Kagoshima District, Kagoshima	099
Kagoshima District, Kagoshima	09912
Kagoshima District, Kagoshima	09913
Kagoshima, Kagoshima	099
Kanoya, Kagoshima	0994
Kaseda, Kagoshima	0993
Kawanabe District, Kagoshima	0933
Kawanabe District, Kagoshima	0993
Kimotsuki District, Kagoshima	0994
Kimotsuki District, Kagoshima	09942
Kokubu, Kagoshima	0995
Kumage District, Kagoshima	09972
Kumage District, Kagoshima	09974
Kushikino, Kagoshima	0996
Makurazaki, Kagoshima	0993
Naze, Kagoshima	0997
Nishinoomote, Kagoshima	09972
Okuchi, Kagoshima	09952
Ōshima District, Kagoshima	0997
Ōshima District, Kagoshima	09977
Satsuma District, Kagoshima	0996
Satsuma District, Kagoshima	09969
Sendai, Kagoshima	0996
Soo District, Kagoshima	0986
Soo District, Kagoshima	0994
Tarumizu, Kagoshima	0994

== Kanagawa ==
Aikō District, Kanagawa	0462
Ashigarashimo District, Kanagawa	0460
Ashigarashimo District, Kanagawa	0465
Atsugi, Kanagawa	0462
Ayase, Kanagawa	0467
Chigasaki, Kanagawa	0467
Ebina, Kanagawa	0462
Fujisawa, Kanagawa	0466
Hadano, Kanagawa	0463
Hiratsuka, Kanagawa	0463
Isehara, Kanagawa	0463
Kamakura, Kanagawa	0467
Kawasaki, Kanagawa	0427
Kawasaki, Kanagawa	044
Koza District, Kanagawa	0467
Minamiashigara, Kanagawa	0465
Miura District, Kanagawa	0468
Miura, Kanagawa	0468
Naka District, Kanagawa	0463
Naka District, Kanagawa	0465
Odawara, Kanagawa	0465
Sagamihara, Kanagawa	0427
Sagamihara, Kanagawa	0462
Tsukui District, Kanagawa	0426
Tsukui District, Kanagawa	0427
Yamato, Kanagawa	0462
Yokohama, Kanagawa	0427
Yokohama, Kanagawa	044
Yokohama, Kanagawa	045
Yokosuka, Kanagawa	0468
Zama, Kanagawa	0427
Zama, Kanagawa	0462
Zushi, Kanagawa	0467
Zushi, Kanagawa	0468

== Kōchi ==
Agawa District, Kōchi	0888
Agawa District, Kōchi	0889
Aki District, Kōchi	08872
Aki District, Kōchi	08873
Aki District, Kōchi	08874
Aki, Kōchi	08873
Hata District, Kōchi	0880
Hata District, Kōchi	08802
Kami District, Kōchi	08875
Kami District, Kōchi	0888
Kōchi, Kōchi	0888
Muroto, Kōchi	08872
Nagaoka District, Kōchi	0887
Nagaoka District, Kōchi	08875
Nakamura, Kōchi	0880
Nankoku, Kōchi	0888
Sukumo, Kōchi	0880
Susaki, Kōchi	0888
Susaki, Kōchi	0889
Takaoka District, Kōchi	08802
Takaoka District, Kōchi	0889
Tosa District, Kōchi	0887
Tosa District, Kōchi	0888
Tosa, Kōchi	0888
Tosashimizu, Kōchi	08808
Tosashimizu, Kōchi	0880

== Kumamoto ==
Amakusa District, Kumamoto	0964
Amakusa District, Kumamoto	0969
Amakusa District, Kumamoto	09697
Arao, Kumamoto	0944
Ashikita District, Kumamoto	0966
Aso District, Kumamoto	096
Aso District, Kumamoto	0967
Aso District, Kumamoto	09676
Aso District, Kumamoto	0973
Hitoyoshi, Kumamoto	0966
Hondo, Kumamoto	0969
Kamimashiki District, Kumamoto	096
Kamimashiki District, Kumamoto	0967
Kamoto District, Kumamoto	096
Kamoto District, Kumamoto	0968
Kikuchi District, Kumamoto	096
Kikuchi District, Kumamoto	0968
Kikuchi, Kumamoto	0968
Kuma District, Kumamoto	0966
Kumamoto, Kumamoto	096
Minamata, Kumamoto	0966
Shimomashiki District, Kumamoto	096
Shimomashiki District, Kumamoto	0964
Tamana District, Kumamoto	0968
Tamana, Kumamoto	0968
Ushibuka, Kumamoto	09697
Uto District, Kumamoto	0964
Uto, Kumamoto	0964
Yamaga, Kumamoto	0968
Yatsushiro District, Kumamoto	0964
Yatsushiro, Kumamoto	0965

== Kyoto ==
Amata District, Kyoto	0773
Ayabe, Kyoto	0773
Fukuchiyama, Kyoto	0773
Funai District, Kyoto	0771
Jōyō, Kyoto	0774
Kameoka, Kyoto	0771
Kasa District, Kyoto	0773
Kitakuwada District, Kyoto	0771
Kumano District, Kyoto	0772
Kuse District, Kyoto	075
Kuse District, Kyoto	0774
Kyōtanabe, Kyoto	0774
Kyoto, Kyoto	0726
Kyoto, Kyoto	075
Kyoto, Kyoto	0775
Maizuru, Kyoto	0773
Miyazu, Kyoto	0772
Mukō, Kyoto	075
Nagaokakyō, Kyoto	075
Naka District, Kyoto	0772
Otokuni District, Kyoto	075
Soraku District, Kyoto	07439
Soraku District, Kyoto	074395
Soraku District, Kyoto	0774
Takeno District, Kyoto	0772
Tsuzuki District, Kyoto	0774
Uji, Kyoto	0774
Yawata, Kyoto	075
Yosa District, Kyoto	0772

== Mie ==
Age District, Mie	059
Ayama District, Mie	0595
Hisai, Mie	059
Ichishi District, Mie	059
Ichishi District, Mie	0598
Ichishi District, Mie	05984
Ichishi District, Mie	059856
Iinan District, Mie	059832
Iinan District, Mie	05984
Inabe District, Mie	0594
Ise, Mie	0596
Ise, Mie	0599
Kameyama, Mie	05958
Kitamuro District, Mie	05973
Kitamuro District, Mie	05974
Kumano, Mie	05978
Kuwana District, Mie	0567
Kuwana District, Mie	0594
Kuwana, Mie	0594
Matsusaka, Mie	0598
Mie District, Mie	0593
Minamimuro District, Mie	05979
Minamimuro District, Mie	0735
Minamimuro District, Mie	07354
Nabari, Mie	0595
Naga District, Mie	0595
Owase, Mie	05972
Shima District, Mie	05994
Shima District, Mie	05995
Shima District, Mie	05997
Shima District, Mie	05998
Suzuka District, Mie	05959
Suzuka, Mie	0593
Taki District, Mie	0596
Taki District, Mie	05983
Taki District, Mie	059849
Taki District, Mie	05987
Taki District, Mie	05988
Toba, Mie	0599
Toba, Mie	05995
Tsu, Mie	059
Ueno, Mie	0595
Watarai District, Mie	05987
Watarai District, Mie	059872
Watarai District, Mie	05988
Watarai District, Mie	05996
Yokkaichi, Mie	0593

== Miyagi ==
Furukawa, Miyagi	0229
Igu District, Miyagi	0224
Igu District, Miyagi	0244
Ishinomaki, Miyagi	0225
Iwanuma, Miyagi	0223
Kakuda, Miyagi	0224
Kami District, Miyagi	0229
Katta District, Miyagi	0224
Kesennuma, Miyagi	0226
Kurihara District, Miyagi	0228
Kurokawa District, Miyagi	022
Miyagi District, Miyagi	022
Monou District, Miyagi	0225
Motoyoshi District, Miyagi	0225
Motoyoshi District, Miyagi	0226
Natori, Miyagi	022
Natori, Miyagi	0223
Natori, Miyagi	023
Oshika District, Miyagi	0225
Sendai, Miyagi	022
Shibata District, Miyagi	0224
Shida District, Miyagi	0229
Shiogama, Miyagi	022
Shiroishi, Miyagi	0224
Tagajō, Miyagi	022
Tamatsukuri District, Miyagi	0229
Tōda District, Miyagi	0225
Tōda District, Miyagi	0229
Tome District, Miyagi	0220
Tome District, Miyagi	0225
Tome District, Miyagi	0228
Watari District, Miyagi	0223

== Miyazaki ==
Ebino, Miyazaki	0984
Higashimorokata District, Miyazaki	0984
Higashimorokata District, Miyazaki	0985
Higashiusuki District, Miyazaki	0982
Higashiusuki District, Miyazaki	0983
Hyuuga, Miyazaki	0982
Kitamorokata District, Miyazaki	0986
Kobayashi, Miyazaki	0984
Koyu District, Miyazaki	0966
Koyu District, Miyazaki	0982
Koyu District, Miyazaki	0983
Koyu District, Miyazaki	0985
Kushima, Miyazaki	0987
Minaminaka District, Miyazaki	0987
Miyakonojo, Miyazaki	0986
Miyazaki District, Miyazaki	0985
Miyazaki, Miyazaki	0985
Nichinan, Miyazaki	0987
Nishimorokata District, Miyazaki	0984
Nishiusuki District, Miyazaki	0982
Nobeoka, Miyazaki	0982
Saito, Miyazaki	0983
Saito, Miyazaki	0985

== Nagano ==
Chiisagata District, Nagano	0267
Chiisagata District, Nagano	0268
Chino, Nagano	0266
Hanishina District, Nagano	026
Hanishina District, Nagano	0268
Higashichikuma District, Nagano	0263
Iida, Nagano	0265
Iiyama, Nagano	0269
Ina, Nagano	0265
Kamiina District, Nagano	0265
Kamiina District, Nagano	0266
Kamiminochi District, Nagano	026
Kamitakai District, Nagano	026
Kiso District, Nagano	0264
Kiso District, Nagano	0573
Kitaazumi District, Nagano	0255
Kitaazumi District, Nagano	0261
Kitasaku District, Nagano	0267
Kitasaku District, Nagano	0268
Komagane, Nagano	0265
Komoro, Nagano	0267
Koshoku, Nagano	026
Matsumoto, Nagano	0263
Minamiazumi District, Nagano	0263
Minamisaku District, Nagano	0267
Minamisaku District, Nagano	0274
Nagano, Nagano	026
Nagano, Nagano	0268
Nakano, Nagano	0269
Ōmachi, Nagano	0261
Okaya, Nagano	0266
Saku, Nagano	0267
Sarashina District, Nagano	026
Sarashina District, Nagano	0268
Shimoina District, Nagano	0260
Shimoina District, Nagano	0265
Shimominochi District, Nagano	0257
Shimominochi District, Nagano	0269
Shimotakai District, Nagano	0269
Shiojiri, Nagano	0263
Shiojiri, Nagano	0266
Suwa District, Nagano	0266
Suwa, Nagano	0266
Suzaka, Nagano	026
Ueda, Nagano	0268

== Nagasaki ==
Fukue, Nagasaki	0959
Higashisonogi District, Nagasaki	0956
Higashisonogi District, Nagasaki	0957
Hirado, Nagasaki	0950
Iki, Nagasaki	09204
Isahaya, Nagasaki	0957
Kamiagata District, Nagasaki	09208
Kitamatsuura District, Nagasaki	0950
Kitamatsuura District, Nagasaki	0956
Kitamatsuura District, Nagasaki	0959
Kitatakaki District, Nagasaki	0957
Matsuura, Nagasaki	0956
Minamimatsura District, Nagasaki	0959
Minamitakaki District, Nagasaki	0957
Nagasaki, Nagasaki	095
Nishisonogi District, Nagasaki	095
Nishisonogi District, Nagasaki	0957
Nishisonogi District, Nagasaki	0959
Omura, Nagasaki	0957
Sasebo, Nagasaki	0956
Shimabara, Nagasaki	0957
Shimoagata District, Nagasaki	09205

== Nara ==
Gojō, Nara	07472
Gose, Nara	0721
Gose, Nara	0745
Ikoma District, Nara	0743
Ikoma District, Nara	0745
Ikoma, Nara	0743
Kashiba, Nara	0745
Kashihara, Nara	0744
Kitakatsuragi District, Nara	0745
Nara, Nara	0742
Sakurai, Nara	0744
Shiki District, Nara	0743
Shiki District, Nara	07443
Shiki District, Nara	0745
Soekami District, Nara	07439
Takaichi District, Nara	0744
Takaichi District, Nara	0745
Tenri, Nara	0743
Uda District, Nara	059
Uda District, Nara	0743
Uda District, Nara	0745
Yamabe District, Nara	0743
Yamatokōriyama, Nara	0743
Yamatotakada, Nara	0745
Yoshino District, Nara	07354
Yoshino District, Nara	0744
Yoshino District, Nara	0745
Yoshino District, Nara	07463
Yoshino District, Nara	0747
Yoshino District, Nara	07473

== Niigata ==
Arai, Niigata	0255
Gosen, Niigata	0250
Higashikanbara District, Niigata	02549
Higashikubiki District, Niigata	0255
Higashikubiki District, Niigata	02559
Itoigawa, Niigata	0255
Iwafune District, Niigata	0235
Iwafune District, Niigata	0254
Jōetsu, Niigata	0255
Kamo, Niigata	0256
Kariwa District, Niigata	0257
Kariwa District, Niigata	0258
Kashiwazaki, Niigata	0257
Kitakanbara District, Niigata	025
Kitakanbara District, Niigata	0254
Kitauonuma District, Niigata	02579
Kitauonuma District, Niigata	0258
Koshi District, Niigata	0258
Minamikanbara District, Niigata	0256
Minamiuonuma District, Niigata	0257
Minamiuonuma District, Niigata	0258
Mitsuke, Niigata	0258
Murakami, Niigata	0254
Nagaoka, Niigata	0258
Nakakanbara District, Niigata	0250
Nakakubiki District, Niigata	0255
Nakauonuma District, Niigata	0257
Niigata, Niigata	025
Niitsu, Niigata	0250
Nishikanbara District, Niigata	025
Nishikubiki District, Niigata	0255
Ojiya, Niigata	0258
Ryotsu, Niigata	0259
Sado, Niigata	0259
Sanjō, Niigata	0256
Santō District, Niigata	0258
Sato District, Niigata	0256
Shibata, Niigata	0254
Shirone, Niigata	025
Tochio, Niigata	0258
Tōkamachi, Niigata	0257
Toyosaka, Niigata	025
Tsubame, Niigata	0256

== Ōita ==
Beppu, Ōita	0977
Bungotakada, Ōita	0978
Hayami District, Ōita	0977
Higashikunisaki District, Ōita	09786
Hita District, Ōita	09437
Hita District, Ōita	0973
Hita, Ōita	0973
Kitaamabe District, Ōita	0975
Kitsuki, Ōita	09786
Kusu District, Ōita	09737
Minamiamabe District, Ōita	0972
Minamiamabe District, Ōita	0982
Nakatsu, Ōita	0979
Naoiri District, Ōita	0974
Nishikunisaki District, Ōita	0978
Ono District, Ōita	0974
Ono District, Ōita	0975
Ōita District, Ōita	0975
Ōita District, Ōita	0977
Ōita, Ōita	0975
Saiki, Ōita	0972
Shimoge District, Ōita	0979
Taketa, Ōita	0974
Tsukumi, Ōita	0972
Usa District, Ōita	0978
Usa, Ōita	0978
Usuki, Ōita	0972

== Okayama ==
Aida District, Okayama	08687
Akaiwa District, Okayama	086
Akaiwa District, Okayama	08695
Akaiwa District, Okayama	08699
Asakuchi District, Okayama	086
Asakuchi District, Okayama	0865
Asakuchi District, Okayama	08654
Asakuchi District, Okayama	086542
Asakuchi District, Okayama	086554
Atetsu District, Okayama	0867
Bizen, Okayama	0869
Ibara, Okayama	0866
Jobo District, Okayama	0866
Kasaoka, Okayama	0865
Katsuta District, Okayama	0868
Katsuta District, Okayama	08687
Kawakami District, Okayama	0866
Kibi District, Okayama	086
Kibi District, Okayama	0866
Kojima District, Okayama	086
Kojima District, Okayama	08636
Kume District, Okayama	0867
Kume District, Okayama	0868
Kume District, Okayama	08687
Kume District, Okayama	08695
Kurashiki, Okayama	086
Maniwa District, Okayama	0867
Mitsu District, Okayama	0866
Mitsu District, Okayama	0867
Niimi, Okayama	0867
Oda District, Okayama	0866
Okayama, Okayama	086
Okayama, Okayama	08636
Oku District, Okayama	086
Oku District, Okayama	0869
Oku District, Okayama	08692
Oku District, Okayama	086926
Shitsuki District, Okayama	0866
Sōja, Okayama	0866
Takahashi, Okayama	0866
Tamano, Okayama	086
Tamano, Okayama	0863
Tomata District, Okayama	0867
Tomata District, Okayama	0868
Tsukubo District, Okayama	086
Tsukubo District, Okayama	0866
Tsuyama, Okayama	0868
Wake District, Okayama	0869
Wake District, Okayama	08695

== Okinawa ==
Ginowan, Okinawa	098
Gushikawa, Okinawa	098
Hirara, Okinawa	09807
Ishigaki, Okinawa	09808
Ishikawa, Okinawa	098
Itoman, Okinawa	098
Kunigami District, Okinawa	098
Kunigami District, Okinawa	0980
Miyako District, Okinawa	09807
Nago, Okinawa	0980
Naha, Okinawa	098
Nakagami District, Okinawa	098
Okinawa, Okinawa	098
Shimajiri District, Okinawa	098
Shimajiri District, Okinawa	0980
Shimajiri District, Okinawa	09802
Urasoe, Okinawa	098
Yaeyama District, Okinawa	09808

== Osaka ==
Daitō, Osaka	072
Fujiidera, Osaka	0729
Habikino, Osaka	0729
Hannan, Osaka	072
Higashiōsaka District, Osaka	0729
Higashiōsaka, Osaka	06
Higashiōsaka, Osaka	072
Hirakata, Osaka	072
Ibaraki, Osaka	06
Ibaraki, Osaka	0726
Ikeda, Osaka	06
Ikeda, Osaka	0727
Izumi, Osaka	0725
Izumiōtsu, Osaka	0725
Izumisano, Osaka	072
Kadoma, Osaka	06
Kadoma, Osaka	072
Kaizuka, Osaka	072
Kashiwara, Osaka	0729
Katano, Osaka	072
Kawachinagano, Osaka	0721
Kishiwada, Osaka	072
Matsubara, Osaka	0723
Minamikawachi District, Osaka	0721
Minamikawachi District, Osaka	0723
Minoh, Osaka	0727
Mishima District, Osaka	075
Moriguchi, Osaka	06
Neyagawa, Osaka	072
Osaka, Osaka	06
Osaka, Osaka	0723
Ōsakasayama, Osaka	0723
Sakai, Osaka	0722
Senboku District, Osaka	0724
Senboku District, Osaka	0725
Sennan District, Osaka	072
Sennan, Osaka	072
Settsu, Osaka	06
Settsu, Osaka	0726
Shijōnawate, Osaka	072
Shijōnawate, Osaka	07437
Suita, Osaka	06
Takaishi, Osaka	0722
Takatsuki, Osaka	0726
Tondabayashi, Osaka	0721
Tondabayashi, Osaka	0723
Toyonaka, Osaka	06
Toyonaka, Osaka	0727
Toyono District, Osaka	0727
Yao, Osaka	06
Yao, Osaka	0729

== Saga ==
Fujitsu District, Saga	0954
Fujitsu District, Saga	09546
Higashimatsuura District, Saga	0955
Imari, Saga	0955
Kanzaki District, Saga	092
Kanzaki District, Saga	0952
Karatsu, Saga	0955
Kashima, Saga	09546
Kishima District, Saga	0952
Kishima District, Saga	0954
Kishima District, Saga	09546
Miyaki District, Saga	0942
Miyaki District, Saga	0952
Nishimatsuura District, Saga	0955
Ogi District, Saga	0952
Saga District, Saga	0952
Saga, Saga	0952
Takeo, Saga	0954
Taku, Saga	0952
Tosu, Saga	0942

== Saitama ==
Ageo, Saitama	048
Asaka, Saitama	048
Chichibu District, Saitama	0274
Chichibu District, Saitama	0493
Chichibu District, Saitama	0494
Chichibu, Saitama	0494
Fujimi, Saitama	048
Fujimi, Saitama	0492
Fukaya, Saitama	0485
Gyōda, Saitama	0485
Hannō, Saitama	0429
Hanyū, Saitama	0485
Hasuda, Saitama	048
Hatogaya, Saitama	048
Hidaka, Saitama	0429
Higashimatsuyama, Saitama	0493
Hiki District, Saitama	0492
Hiki District, Saitama	0493
Honjō, Saitama	0495
Iruma District, Saitama	0429
Iruma District, Saitama	0492
Iruma, Saitama	0429
Iwatsuki, Saitama	048
Kamifukuoka, Saitama	0492
Kasukabe, Saitama	048
Kawagoe, Saitama	048
Kawagoe, Saitama	0492
Kawaguchi, Saitama	048
Kazo, Saitama	0480
Kitaadachi District, Saitama	048
Kitaadachi District, Saitama	0485
Kitakatsushika District, Saitama	048
Kitakatsushika District, Saitama	0480
Kitakatsushika District, Saitama	0489
Kitamoto, Saitama	0485
Kitasaitama District, Saitama	0280
Kitasaitama District, Saitama	0480
Kitasaitama District, Saitama	0485
Kodama District, Saitama	0274
Kodama District, Saitama	0495
Konosu, Saitama	0485
Koshigaya, Saitama	0489
Kuki, Saitama	0480
Kumagaya, Saitama	0485
Minamisaitama District, Saitama	0480
Misato, Saitama	0489
Niiza, Saitama	0424
Niiza, Saitama	048
Omiya, Saitama	048
Ōsato District, Saitama	0276
Ōsato District, Saitama	0485
Ōsato, Saitama	0493
Okegawa, Saitama	048
Sakado, Saitama	0492
Satte, Saitama	0480
Sayama, Saitama	0429
Shiki, Saitama	048
Sōka, Saitama	0489
Toda, Saitama	048
Tokorozawa, Saitama	0429
Tsurugashima, Saitama	0492
Urawa, Saitama	048
Wakō, Saitama	048
Warabi, Saitama	048
Yashio, Saitama	0489
Yono, Saitama	048
Yoshikawa, Saitama	0489

== Shiga ==
Echi District, Shiga	0748
Echi District, Shiga	0749
Gamo District, Shiga	0748
Higashiazai District, Shiga	0749
Hikone, Shiga	0749
Ika District, Shiga	0749
Inukami District, Shiga	0749
Kanzaki District, Shiga	0748
Koka District, Shiga	0748
Kurita District, Shiga	077
Kusatsu, Shiga	077
Moriyama, Shiga	077
Nagahama, Shiga	0749
Ōtsu, Shiga	077
Ōmihachiman, Shiga	0748
Sakata District, Shiga	0749
Shiga District, Shiga	077
Takashima District, Shiga	0740
Yasu District, Shiga	077
Yokaichi, Shiga	0748

== Shimane ==
Gōtsu, Shimane	0855
Hamada, Shimane	0855
Hikawa District, Shimane	0853
Hirata, Shimane	0853
Iishi District, Shimane	0854
Izumo, Shimane	0853
Kanoashi District, Shimane	08567
Masuda, Shimane	0856
Matsue, Shimane	0852
Mino District, Shimane	0856
Naka District, Shimane	0855
Nima District, Shimane	08548
Nima District, Shimane	0855
Nita District, Shimane	0854
Nogi District, Shimane	0854
Ōchi District, Shimane	0855
Ōda, Shimane	08548
Ohara District, Shimane	0854
Oki District, Shimane	08514
Yasugi, Shimane	0854
Yatsuka District, Shimane	0852

== Shizuoka ==
Atami, Shizuoka	0465
Atami, Shizuoka	0557
Fuji District, Shizuoka	054
Fuji, Shizuoka	0545
Fujieda, Shizuoka	054
Fujinomiya, Shizuoka	0544
Fukuroi, Shizuoka	0538
Gotemba, Shizuoka	0550
Haibara District, Shizuoka	0547
Haibara District, Shizuoka	0548
Hamamatsu, Shizuoka	053
Hamana District, Shizuoka	053
Ihara District, Shizuoka	0543
Ihara District, Shizuoka	0545
Inasa District, Shizuoka	053
Ito, Shizuoka	0557
Iwata District, Shizuoka	0538
Iwata District, Shizuoka	0539
Iwata, Shizuoka	0538
Kakegawa, Shizuoka	0537
Kamo District, Shizuoka	0557
Kamo District, Shizuoka	0558
Kosai, Shizuoka	053
Mishima, Shizuoka	0559
Numazu, Shizuoka	0559
Ogasa District, Shizuoka	0537
Ogasa District, Shizuoka	0538
Ogasa District, Shizuoka	0547
Ogasa District, Shizuoka	0548
Shida District, Shizuoka	054
Shimada, Shizuoka	0547
Shimizu, Shizuoka	0543
Shimoda, Shizuoka	0558
Shizuoka, Shizuoka	054
Shuchi District, Shizuoka	0538
Shuchi District, Shizuoka	0539
Sunto District, Shizuoka	0550
Sunto District, Shizuoka	0559
Susono, Shizuoka	0559
Tagata District, Shizuoka	0557
Tagata District, Shizuoka	0558
Tagata District, Shizuoka	0559
Tenryū, Shizuoka	0539
Yaizu, Shizuoka	054

== Tochigi ==
Ashikaga, Tochigi	0284
Aso District, Tochigi	0283
Haga District, Tochigi	028
Haga District, Tochigi	0285
Imaichi, Tochigi	0288
Kamitsuga District, Tochigi	0282
Kamitsuga District, Tochigi	0288
Kamitsuga District, Tochigi	0289
Kanuma, Tochigi	0289
Kawachi District, Tochigi	028
Kawachi District, Tochigi	0285
Kuroiso, Tochigi	0287
Mooka, Tochigi	0285
Nasu District, Tochigi	0287
Nikkō, Tochigi	0288
Ōtawara, Tochigi	0287
Oyama, Tochigi	0280
Oyama, Tochigi	0282
Oyama, Tochigi	0285
Oyama, Tochigi	0296
Sano, Tochigi	0283
Shimotsuga District, Tochigi	0280
Shimotsuga District, Tochigi	0282
Shimotsuga District, Tochigi	0285
Shioya District, Tochigi	028
Shioya District, Tochigi	0287
Shioya District, Tochigi	0288
Tochigi, Tochigi	0282
Utsunomiya, Tochigi	028
Yaita, Tochigi	0287

== Tokushima ==
Anan, Tokushima	0884
Awa District, Tokushima	0883
Itano District, Tokushima	0886
Kaifu District, Tokushima	08847
Katsura District, Tokushima	08854
Komatsushima, Tokushima	08853
Komatsushima, Tokushima	0886
Mima District, Tokushima	0883
Miyoshi District, Tokushima	0883
Miyoshi District, Tokushima	0886
Myodo District, Tokushima	0886
Myozai District, Tokushima	0886
Naka District, Tokushima	0884
Naka District, Tokushima	08846
Naka District, Tokushima	08853
Naruto, Tokushima	0886
Oe District, Tokushima	0883
Tokushima District, Tokushima	08853
Tokushima, Tokushima	0886

== Tokyo ==
Akiruno, Tokyo	042
Akishima, Tokyo	042
Chōfu, Tokyo	0422
Chōfu, Tokyo	0424
Fuchu, Tokyo	042
Fuchu, Tokyo	0423
Fuchu, Tokyo	0424
Fussa, Tokyo	042
Hachijō, Tokyo	04996
Hachiōji, Tokyo	042
Hachiōji, Tokyo	0426
Hamura, Tokyo	042
Higashikurume, Tokyo	0424
Higashimurayama, Tokyo	0423
Higashiyamato, Tokyo	042
Hino, Tokyo	042
Hoya, Tokyo	0422
Hoya, Tokyo	0424
Inagi, Tokyo	0423
Kiyose, Tokyo	0424
Kodaira, Tokyo	0423
Kodaira, Tokyo	0424
Koganei, Tokyo	0422
Koganei, Tokyo	0423
Kokubunji, Tokyo	042
Kokubunji, Tokyo	0423
Kokuritsu, Tokyo	042
Konoe, Tokyo	0424
Machida, Tokyo	0427
Machida, Tokyo	044
Mitaka, Tokyo	0422
Miyake, Tokyocho	04994
Musashimurayama, Tokyo	042
Musashino, Tokyo	0422
Nishitama, Tokyo	042
Nishitama, Tokyo	0428
Ogasawara, Tokyo	04998
Ōme, Tokyo	0428
Ōshima, Tokyocho	04992
Tachikawa, Tokyo	042
Tama, Tokyo	0423
Tanashi, Tokyo	0424
Tokyo	03

== Tottori ==
Hino District, Tottori	0859
Iwami District, Tottori	0857
Ketaka District, Tottori	0857
Kurayoshi, Tottori	0858
Saihaku District, Tottori	0858
Saihaku District, Tottori	0859
Sakaiminato, Tottori	0859
Tōhaku District, Tottori	0858
Tottori, Tottori	0857
Yazu District, Tottori	0858
Yonago, Tottori	0859

== Toyama ==
Higashitonami District, Toyama	0763
Himi, Toyama	0766
Imizu District, Toyama	0766
Kaminiikawa District, Toyama	0764
Kurobe, Toyama	0765
Nakaniikawa District, Toyama	0764
Namerikawa, Toyama	0764
Nei District, Toyama	0764
Nishitonami District, Toyama	0763
Nishitonami District, Toyama	0766
Oyabe, Toyama	0766
Shimoniikawa District, Toyama	0765
Shinminato, Toyama	0766
Takaoka, Toyama	0766
Tonami, Toyama	0763
Toyama, Toyama	0764
Toyama, Toyama	0766
Uozu, Toyama	0765

== Wakayama ==
Arida District, Wakayama	0737
Arida, Wakayama	0737
Gobō, Wakayama	0738
Hashimoto, Wakayama	0736
Hidaka District, Wakayama	0738
Hidaka District, Wakayama	0739
Higashimuro District, Wakayama	05979
Higashimuro District, Wakayama	07354
Higashimuro District, Wakayama	073549
Higashimuro District, Wakayama	07355
Higashimuro District, Wakayama	07357
Ito District, Wakayama	0736
Ito District, Wakayama	0737
Kainan, Wakayama	0734
Kaiso District, Wakayama	0734
Naga District, Wakayama	0736
Nishimuro District, Wakayama	07356
Nishimuro District, Wakayama	0739
Shingū, Wakayama	0735
Tanabe, Wakayama	0739
Wakayama, Wakayama	0734

== Yamagata ==
Akumi District, Yamagata	0234
Higashimurayama District, Yamagata	023
Higashimurayama District, Yamagata	0236
Higashimurayama District, Yamagata	0237
Higashine, Yamagata	0237
Higashiokitama District, Yamagata	0238
Higashitagawa District, Yamagata	0234
Higashitagawa District, Yamagata	0235
Kaminoyama, Yamagata	023
Kitamurayama District, Yamagata	0237
Mogami District, Yamagata	023
Mogami District, Yamagata	0234
Murayama, Yamagata	0237
Nagai, Yamagata	0238
Nan'yō, Yamagata	0238
Nishimurayama District, Yamagata	0237
Nishiokitama District, Yamagata	0238
Nishitagawa District, Yamagata	0235
Obanazawa, Yamagata	0237
Sagae, Yamagata	0237
Sakata, Yamagata	0234
Shinjō, Yamagata	0233
Tendō, Yamagata	023
Tendō, Yamagata	0237
Tsuruoka, Yamagata	0235
Yamagata, Yamagata	023
Yonezawa, Yamagata	0238

== Yamaguchi ==
Abu District, Yamaguchi	0838
Abu District, Yamaguchi	08387
Abu District, Yamaguchi	08388
Abu District, Yamaguchi	08395
Asa District, Yamaguchi	0836
Hagi, Yamaguchi	0838
Hikari, Yamaguchi	0833
Hōfu, Yamaguchi	0835
Iwakuni, Yamaguchi	0827
Iwakuni, Yamaguchi	08275
Kuga District, Yamaguchi	0820
Kuga District, Yamaguchi	0827
Kuga District, Yamaguchi	08275
Kumage District, Yamaguchi	0820
Kumage District, Yamaguchi	0833
Mine District, Yamaguchi	08376
Mine District, Yamaguchi	08396
Mine, Yamaguchi	08375
Nagato, Yamaguchi	0837
Ōshima District, Yamaguchi	08207
Otsu District, Yamaguchi	0837
Onoda, Yamaguchi	0836
Saba District, Yamaguchi	0835
Shimonoseki, Yamaguchi	0832
Shimonoseki, Yamaguchi	0833
Shinnan'yō, Yamaguchi	0834
Tokuyama, Yamaguchi	0834
Toyora District, Yamaguchi	0832
Toyora District, Yamaguchi	0837
Toyora District, Yamaguchi	08376
Tsuno District, Yamaguchi	0834
Ube, Yamaguchi	0836
Yamaguchi, Yamaguchi	0839
Yanai, Yamaguchi	0820
Yoshiki District, Yamaguchi	0836
Yoshiki District, Yamaguchi	0839

== Yamanashi ==
Enzan, Yamanashi	0553
Fujiyoshida, Yamanashi	0555
Higashiyamanashi District, Yamanashi	0553
Higashiyatsushiro District, Yamanashi	0552
Kitakoma District, Yamanashi	0266
Kitakoma District, Yamanashi	0551
Kitatsuru District, Yamanashi	0428
Kōfu, Yamanashi	0552
Minamikoma District, Yamanashi	0556
Minamitsuru District, Yamanashi	0427
Minamitsuru District, Yamanashi	0554
Minamitsuru District, Yamanashi	0555
Nakakoma District, Yamanashi	0552
Nirasaki, Yamanashi	0551
Nishiyatsushiro District, Yamanashi	0555
Nishiyatsushiro District, Yamanashi	0552
Nishiyatsushiro District, Yamanashi	0556
Ōtsuki, Yamanashi	0554
Tsuru, Yamanashi	0554
Yamanashi, Yamanashi	0553

== See also ==
- Telephone numbers in Japan
