= Mutsu Province =

Former province of Japan

Mutsu Province 陸奥国
- Province of Japan
- 654–1869
- Map of Japanese provinces (1868) with Mutsu Province highlighted
- Capital: Miyagi District
- History
  - Established: 654
  - Disestablished: 1869
Succeeded by
Rikuō Province
Rikuchū Province
Rikuzen Province
Iwashiro Province
Iwaki Province
- Today part of: Fukushima Prefecture; Miyagi Prefecture; Iwate Prefecture; Akita Prefecture; Aomori Prefecture

Mutsu Province (陸奥国, Mutsu no Kuni; Japanese pronunciation: [mɯ̈́.t͡sɨ̀ (nò̞ kɯ̈̀.ɲ̟ì)]) was a province of Japan in what is now Fukushima, Miyagi, Iwate and Aomori Prefectures and the municipalities of Kazuno and Kosaka in Akita Prefecture.

Mutsu Province is also known as Ōshū (奥州; [ó̞ò̞.ɕɨ̀ɨ̀]) or Michinoku (陸奥・道奥; [mʲì.c̟͡cí.nó̞.kɯ̈́, -kɯ̈̀]); the Eastern Old Japanese name varied between Mutu and Miti.

The combined area of Mutsu and the neighbouring Dewa Province is the Tōhoku region, which was also known as Ōu (奥羽) via on'yomi reading (using Chinese pronunciations of the kanji) used for Mutsu and Dewa.

== History ==
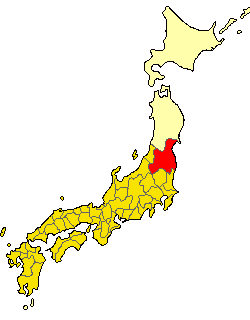
Mutsu Province from 7c. to 712

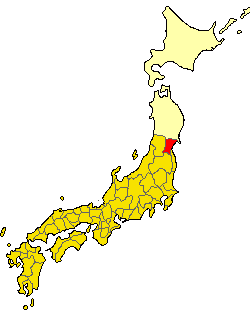
Mutsu Province 718 for several years

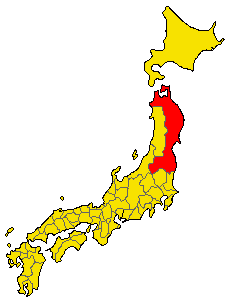
Mutsu Province from 1185 to 1868

=== Invasion by the Kinai government ===
Mutsu, on northern Honshū, was one of the last provinces to be formed as land was taken from the indigenous Emishi, and became the largest as it expanded northward. The ancient regional capital of the Kinai government was Tagajō in present-day Miyagi Prefecture.

- 709 (Wadō 2, 3rd month), an uprising against governmental authority took place in Mutsu and in nearby Echigo Province. Troops were dispatched to subdue the revolt.
- 712 (Wadō 5), Mutsu was separated from Dewa Province. Empress Genmei's Daijō-kan made cadastral changes in the provincial map of the Nara period, as in the following year when Mimasaka Province was split from Bizen Province, Hyūga Province was sundered from Ōsumi Province, and Tanba Province was severed from Tango Province.
- 718, Shineha, Uda and Watari districts of the Mutsu Province, Kikuta, Iwaki districts of the Hitachi Province are incorporated into Iwaki Province (718).
- 801, Mutsu was conquered by Sakanoue no Tamuramaro.
- 869 (Jōgan 10, 5th month): A terrible earthquake struck Mutsu. More than 1,000 people lost their lives in the disaster.

=== Prosperity of Hiraizumi ===
In 1095, the Ōshū Fujiwara clan settled at Hiraizumi, under the leadership of Fujiwara no Kiyohira. Kiyohira hoped to "form a city rivaling Kyoto as a centre of culture". The legacy of the Ōshū Fujiwara clan remains with the temples Chūson-ji and Mōtsū-ji in Hiraizumi, and the Shiramizu Amidadō temple building in Iwaki. In 1189, Minamoto no Yoritomo invaded Mutsu with three great forces, eventually killing Fujiwara no Yasuhira and acquiring the entire domain.

=== Sengoku period ===
During the Sengoku period, clans ruled parts of the province.

- The Nanbu clan at Morioka in the north.
- The Date clan at Iwadeyama and Sendai in the south.
- The Sōma clan at Nakamura in the south.
- The Iwaki clan at Iinodaira in the south.
- The Uesugi clan had a castle town at Wakamatsu in the south.

=== After the Boshin War ===
Rikuō (Mutsu) Province from 1869 to 1871

As a result of the Boshin War, Mutsu Province was divided by the Meiji government, on 19 January 1869, into five provinces: Iwashiro, Iwaki, Rikuzen, Rikuchū, and Rikuō). The fifth of these, corresponding roughly to today's Aomori Prefecture, was assigned the same two kanji as the entire province prior to division; however, the character reading was different. Due to the similarity in characters in the name, this smaller province has also sometimes been referred to as 'Mutsu'.

== Districts ==
=== Under Ritsuryō ===
Iwate Prefecture

- Kesen District (気仙郡)
- Isawa District (膽沢郡)
- Esashi District (江刺郡)
- Iwai District (磐井郡) (split into Higashiiwai and Nishiiwai districts)
- Waga District (和賀郡)
- Shiwa District (紫波郡)
- Hienuki District (稗貫郡) (dissolved in 2005)
- Iwate District (岩手郡)
- Hei District (閉伊郡) (split in 1879)
  - Kitahei District (北閉伊郡)
  - Higashihei District (東閉伊郡)
  - Nishihei District (西閉伊郡)
  - Minamihei District (南閉伊郡)
- Kunohe District (九戸郡)

Miyagi Prefecture

- Katta District (刈田郡)
- Igu District (伊具郡)
- Watari District (亘理郡)
- Shibata District (柴田郡)
- Natori District (名取郡)
- Miyagi District (宮城郡)
- Kurokawa District (黒川郡)
- Kami District (賀美郡)
- Shikama District (色麻郡) (dissolved, merged with Kami District)
- Tamatsukuri District (玉造郡)
- Shida District (志太郡)
- Kurihara District (栗原郡)
- Nagaoka District (長岡郡) (distinct from the one in Kōchi Prefecture)
- Niita District (新田郡) (distinct from the one in Gunma Prefecture; dissolved, absorbed into Kurihara District)
- Oda District (小田郡) (dissolved, now in the city of Tome, Miyagi Prefecture)
- Tōda District (遠田郡)
- Oshika District (牡鹿郡)
- Tome District (登米郡)
- Monou District (桃生郡)

Fukushima Prefecture

- Iwase District (磐瀬郡)
- Aizu District (会津郡)
  - Yama District (耶麻郡) (separated from Aizu District during the Heian period)
  - Ōnuma District (大沼郡) (separated from Aizu District during the Heian period)
  - Kawanuma District (河沼郡) (separated from Aizu District during the Heian period)
- Asaka District (安積郡)
  - Tamura District (田村郡) (split off from Asaka District in 1717)
- Adachi District (安達郡)
- Shinobu District (信夫郡)
  - Date District (伊達郡) (split off from Shinobu District in first half of 10th century)
    - Mogami District (最上郡) (transferred to Dewa Province in 712)
    - Murayama District (村山郡) (transferred to Dewa Province in 712)
    - Okitama District (置賜郡) (transferred to Dewa Province in 712)
- Nishishirakawa District (西白河郡)
- Higashishirakawa District (東白川郡)
- Ishikawa District (石川郡)
- Kikuta District (菊多郡)
- Iwaki District (石城郡)
- Shineha District (標葉郡)
- Namekata District (行方郡)
- Uda District (宇多郡)

=== Meiji Era ===
- Aomori Prefecture
  - Tsugaru District (津軽郡)
    - Higashitsugaru District (東津軽郡)
    - Kitatsugaru District (北津軽郡)
    - Minamitsugaru District (南津軽郡)
    - Nakatsugaru District (中津軽郡)
    - Nishitsugaru District (西津軽郡)
  - Kita District (北郡)
  - Sannohe District (三戸郡)
- Iwate Prefecture
  - Ninohe District (二戸郡)

== See also ==
- Dewa Province
- Japanese battleship Mutsu, the World War II Imperial Japanese Navy warship named after the province.
- Sanriku
- Tōhoku region
- Tōsandō
