= Miyagi 5th district =

- Parliamentary constituency for the Japanese House of Representatives
- Numbered map of the Miyagi Prefecture single seats
- Prefecture: Miyagi
- Proportional District: Tohoku
- Electorate: 332,993

Current constituency
- Created: 1994
- Seats: One
- Party: LDP
- Representative: Itsunori Onodera
- Municipalities: Kesennuma, Kurihara, Ōsaki, and Tome, Kami District, Motoyoshi District, and Tōda District.

Miyagi 5th district (宮城県第5区, Miyagi-ken dai-goku or simply 宮城5区, Miyagi-goku) is a single-member constituency of the House of Representatives in the national Diet of Japan located in Miyagi Prefecture.

== Areas covered ==
=== Since 2022 ===
- Kesennuma
- Kurihara
- Ōsaki
- Tome
- Kami District
- Motoyoshi District
- Tōda District

=== 2017 - 2022 ===
- Higashimatsushima
- Ishinomaki
- Part of Ōsaki
- Part of Kurokawa District
  - Ōsato
- Part of Miyagi District
  - Matsushima
- Motoyoshi District
- Oshika District
- Tōda District

=== 1994 - 2017 ===
- Ishinomaki
- Monou District
- Oshika District
- Tōda District

== List of representatives ==
Election	Representative	Party	Notes
1996	Jun Azumi	Democratic	
2000	Jun Azumi	Democratic	
2003	Jun Azumi	Democratic	
2005	Jun Azumi	Democratic	
2009	Jun Azumi	Democratic	
2012	Jun Azumi	Democratic	
2014	Jun Azumi	Democratic	
2014	Jun Azumi	Democratic	
2017	Jun Azumi	Independent	
2021	Jun Azumi	CDP	
2024	Itsunori Onodera	LDP	
2026	Itsunori Onodera	LDP	

== Election results ==
=== 2026 ===
2026
Party	Candidate	Votes	%	±%
LDP	Itsunori Onodera	138,094	77.37	
Centrist Reform	Tsuneharu Sakai	30,691	17.20	N/A
JCP	Yutaka Yūki	9,698	5.43	
Majority		107,403	60.17	
Registered electors		330,414		
Turnout			55.13	▲1.45
LDP hold				

=== 2024 ===
2024
Party	Candidate	Votes	%	±%
LDP	Itsunori Onodera	132,361	74.66	
Ishin	Tsuneharu Sakai	26,502	14.95	New
JCP	Ren Nakajima	18,413	10.39	N/A
Majority		105,859	59.71	
Registered electors		337,529		
Turnout			53.68	▼3.66
LDP gain from CDP				

=== 2021 ===
2021
Party	Candidate	Votes	%	±%
CDP	Jun Azumi	81,033	56.89	
LDP	Chisato Morishita	61,410	43.11	
Majority		19,623	13.78	
Registered electors		252,373		
Turnout			57.34	▲3.33
CDP hold				

=== 2017 ===
2017
Party	Candidate	Votes	%	±%
Independent	Jun Azumi	89,423	63.91	
LDP	Shigeaki Katsunuma	50,496	36.09	
Majority		38,927	27.82	
Registered electors		263,675		
Turnout			54.01	▲5.86
Independent hold				

=== 2014 ===
2014
Party	Candidate	Votes	%	±%
Democratic	Jun Azumi	64,753	59.51	
LDP	Shigeaki Katsunuma (Won PR seat)	34,293	31.52	
JCP	Naoya Takamura	9,763	8.97	
Majority		30,460	27.99	
Registered electors		231,081		
Turnout			48.15	▼4.71
Democratic hold				

=== 2012 ===
2012
Party	Candidate	Votes	%	±%
Democratic	Jun Azumi	62,928	57.86	
LDP	Miyo Ōkubo (Won PR seat)	30,138	27.71	
Tomorrow	Nobuko Abe	8,029	7.38	New
JCP	Masaaki Watanabe	6,046	5.56	N/A
Independent	Hirotoshi Shutō	1,621	1.49	New
Majority		32,790	30.15	
Registered electors		211,113		
Turnout			52.86	▼15.62
Democratic hold				

=== 2009 ===
2009
Party	Candidate	Votes	%	±%
Democratic	Jun Azumi	89,484	58.57	
LDP	Masami Saitō	63,303	41.43	
Majority		26,181	17.14	
Registered electors		226,277		
Turnout			68.48	▲0.91
Democratic hold				

=== 2005 ===
2005
Party	Candidate	Votes	%	±%
Democratic	Jun Azumi	78,205	50.66	
LDP	Masami Saitō	68,485	44.36	
JCP	Hiroshi Takano	7,691	4.98	
Majority		9,720	6.30	
Registered electors		230,833		
Turnout			67.57	▲4.57
Democratic hold				

=== 2003 ===
2003
Party	Candidate	Votes	%	±%
Democratic	Jun Azumi	73,135	50.75	
LDP	Masami Saitō	64,122	44.50	
JCP	Hiroshi Takano	6,853	4.76	
Majority		9,013	6.25	
Registered electors		232,148		
Turnout			63.00	
Democratic hold				

=== 2000 ===
2000
Party	Candidate	Votes	%	±%
Democratic	Jun Azumi	69,459	47.23	New
LDP	Mikio Doi	68,237	46.40	
JCP	Nobuo Hara	9,355	6.36	
Majority		1,222	0.83	
Registered electors				
Turnout				
Democratic hold				

=== 1996 ===
1996
Party	Candidate	Votes	%	±%
Democratic	Jun Azumi	54,550	40.09	New
New Frontier	Mikio Doi	50,139	36.85	New
LDP	Go Futami	16,407	12.06	New
Social Democratic	Yoshitaka Suda	8,122	5.97	New
JCP	Takaji Naito	6,854	5.04	New
Majority		4,411	3.24	
Registered electors				
Turnout				
Democratic win (new seat)				
