= Tajiri =

Tajiri (written: 田尻 lit. "end of a field") may refer to:

- Tajiri (surname)
- Tajiri, Osaka
- Tajiri, Miyagi
- Shinkichi Tajiri (1923–2009), Japanese American artist, concentration camp inmate, and veteran of the 442nd Regimental Combat Team
- Yoshihiro Tajiri (born 1970), a Japanese professional wrestler commonly known as simply Tajiri
