= Shida District =

Shida District may means:

- Shida District, Miyagi
- Shida District, Shizuoka
