= Nango =

Nango may refer to:

== Places in Japan ==
- Nangō, Aomori, a former village in Aomori Prefecture
- Nangō, Fukushima, a former village in Fukushima Prefecture
- Nangō, Miyagi, a former town in Miyagi Prefecture
- Nangō, Miyazaki (Higashiusuki), a former village in Higashiusuki District, Miyazaki Prefecture
- Nangō, Miyazaki (Minaminaka), a former town in Minaminaka District, Miyazaki Prefecture
- Nango, Yamanashi, a former village in Yamanashii Prefecture

== Other uses ==
- Nango, a subgroup of the Yolngu people of Australia
- Nango, an island off the coast of Kavieng, New Ireland, Papua New Guinea

== See also ==
- Nanggu language, an Austronesian language of the Solomon Islands
