= Ōsaki, Miyagi =

Ōsaki 大崎市
- City
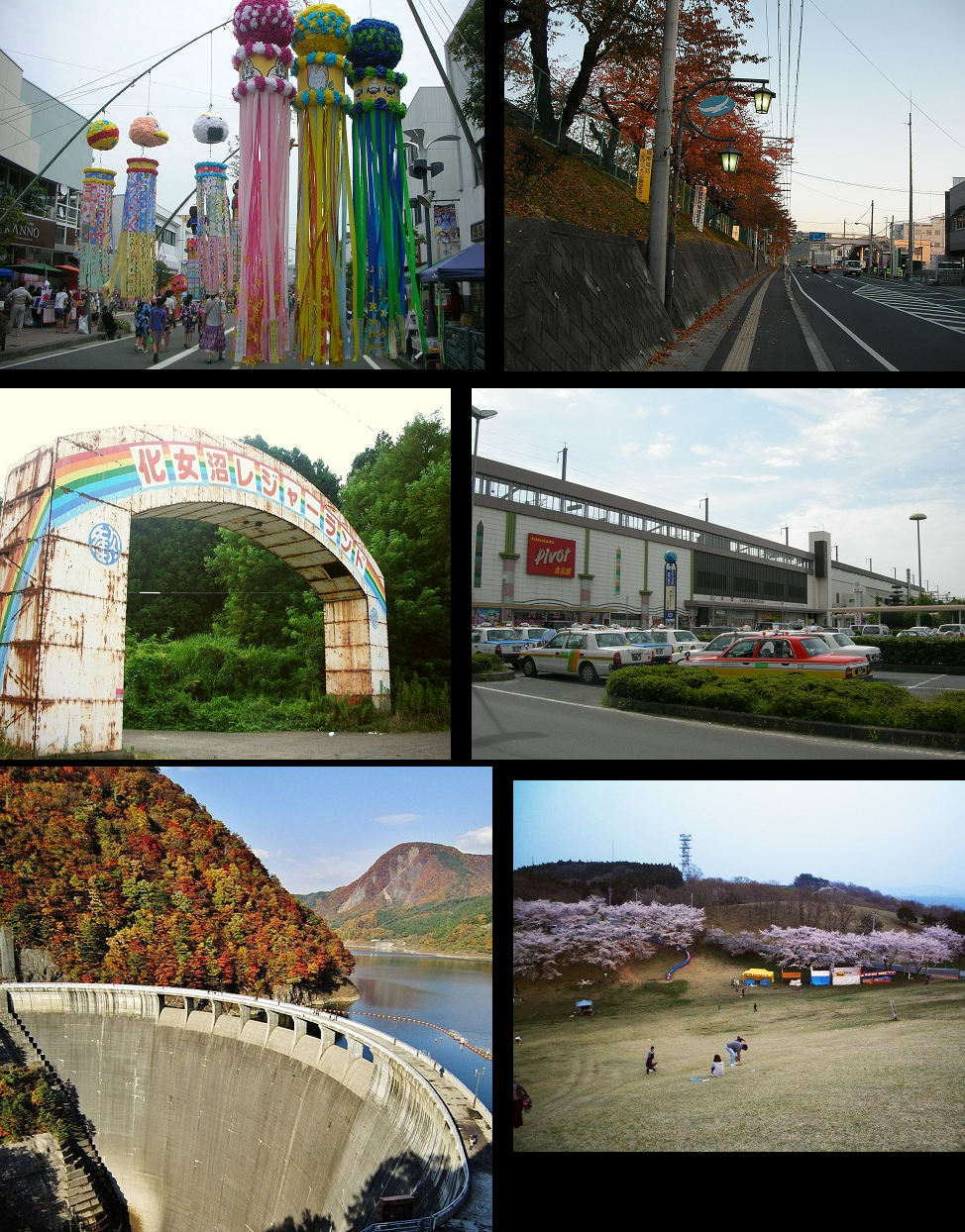
- upper:Furukawa festival, Kashima-dai middle:Kejonuma Leisure Land, Furukawa Station lower:Naruko Dam, Mount Kagoho

- Flag Seal

- Location of Ōsaki in Miyagi Prefecture

- Coordinates: 38°34′37.6″N 140°57′20.1″E
- Country: Japan
- Region: Tōhoku
- Prefecture: Miyagi
- First official recorded: 695 AD
- Narugo Town Settled: April 20, 1921
- Furukawa City Settled: December 15, 1950
- As current city named: March 31, 2006

Government
  - Mayor: Yasushi Ito

Area
  - Total: 796.76 km^{2} (307.63 sq mi)

Population (May 1, 2020)
  - Total: 128,763
  - Density: 161.61/km^{2} (418.56/sq mi)
- Time zone: UTC+9 (Japan Standard Time)
- Phone number: 0229-23-2111
- Address: 1-1 Furukawa Nanokamachi, Ōsaki-shi, Miyagi-ken 989-6188
- Climate: Cfa
- Website: Official website
- Symbols
- Flower: Flowering Dogwood
- Tree: Rose

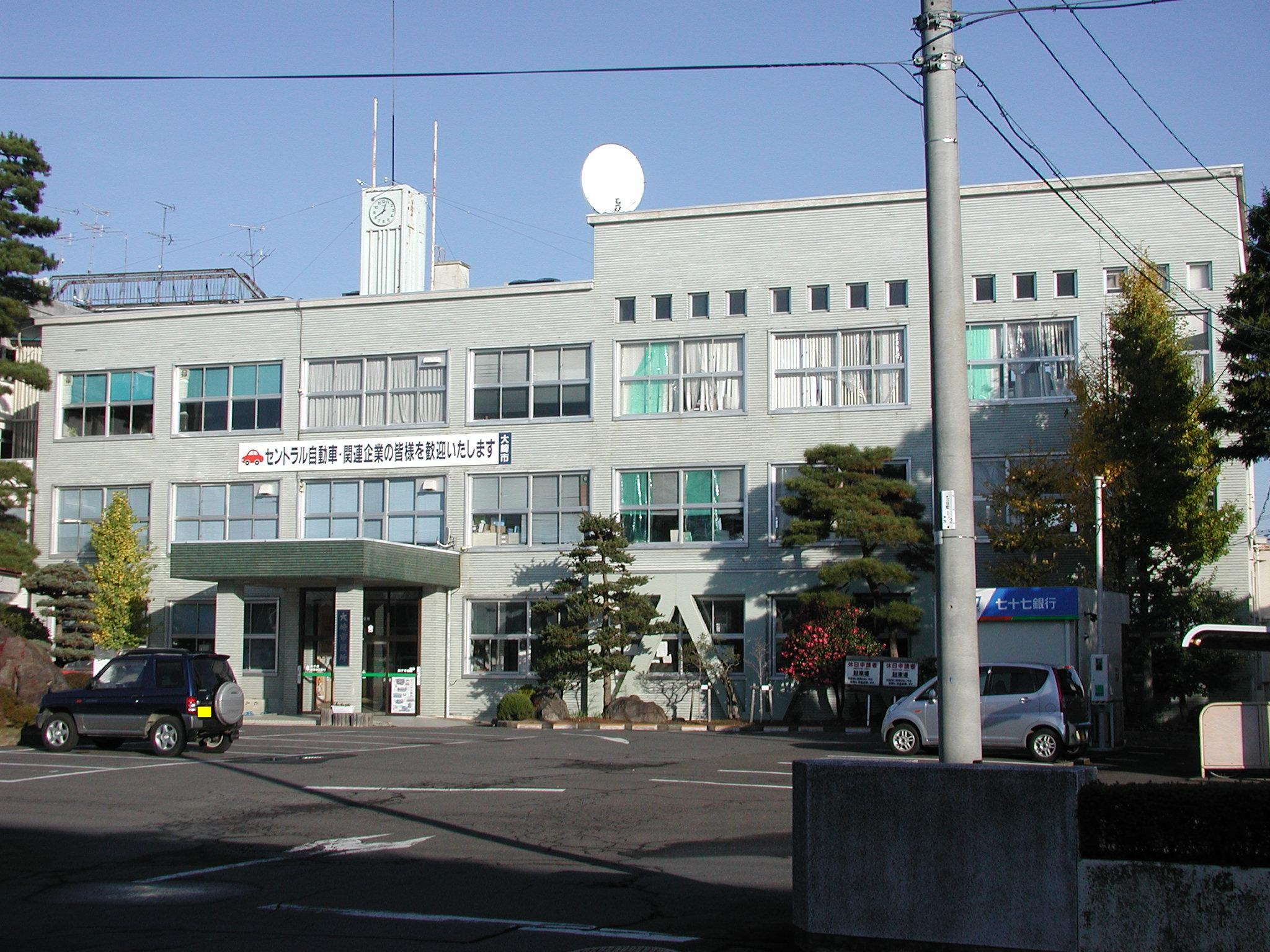
Ōsaki City Hall

Ōsaki (大崎市, Ōsaki-shi; Japanese pronunciation: [ó̞ò̞.sä̀.k̟ʲì, ò̞ó̞.sä́.k̟ʲi̥.ɕì, ó̞ó̞.sä́.k̟ʲi̥-]) is a city located in Miyagi Prefecture, Japan. As of 1 May 2020, the city had an estimated population of 128,763 in 51,567 households, and a population density of 160 persons per km^{2}. The total area of the city is 796.76 square kilometres (307.63 sq mi). Ōsaki is a member of the World Health Organization’s Alliance for Healthy Cities (AFHC).

== Geography ==
Ōsaki is in north-central Miyagi Prefecture in the northern Sendai Plain. The Furukawa area in the center of the city is a base for commercial and service industries in the northern portion of Miyagi Prefecture, and the Naruko area in the northwestern of the city is noted for hot spring tourism . The Kashimadai and Matsuyama districts in the southeastern part of the city are within the commuting zone of Sendai.

=== Neighboring municipalities ===
Akita Prefecture

- Yuzawa

Miyagi Prefecture

- Kami
- Kurihara
- Matsushima
- Misato
- Ōhira
- Ōsato
- Shikama
- Tome
- Wakuya

Yamagata Prefecture

- Mogami

== Climate ==
Ōsaki has a humid subtropical climate (Köppen climate classification Cfa) characterized by hot summers and mild winters. The average annual temperature in Ōsaki is 11.5 °C. The average annual rainfall is 1249 mm with September as the wettest month. The temperatures are highest on average in August, at around 24.4 °C, and lowest in January, at around -0.6 °C.

Climate data for Furukawa, Ōsaki (elevation 28 m, 1991–2020 normals, extremes 1976–present)
Month	Jan	Feb	Mar	Apr	May	Jun	Jul	Aug	Sep	Oct	Nov	Dec	Year
Record high °C (°F)	15.3 (59.5)	18.8 (65.8)	22.5 (72.5)	29.9 (85.8)	33.3 (91.9)	34.0 (93.2)	37.5 (99.5)	36.5 (97.7)	35.0 (95.0)	30.1 (86.2)	24.0 (75.2)	20.5 (68.9)	37.5 (99.5)
Mean daily maximum °C (°F)	3.7 (38.7)	4.9 (40.8)	8.9 (48.0)	15.4 (59.7)	20.5 (68.9)	23.7 (74.7)	26.9 (80.4)	28.4 (83.1)	24.8 (76.6)	19.3 (66.7)	12.9 (55.2)	6.5 (43.7)	16.3 (61.3)
Daily mean °C (°F)	0.0 (32.0)	0.6 (33.1)	3.8 (38.8)	9.4 (48.9)	15.1 (59.2)	19.0 (66.2)	22.5 (72.5)	23.7 (74.7)	20.0 (68.0)	13.9 (57.0)	7.6 (45.7)	2.4 (36.3)	11.5 (52.7)
Mean daily minimum °C (°F)	−3.8 (25.2)	−3.5 (25.7)	−0.9 (30.4)	3.6 (38.5)	10.3 (50.5)	15.3 (59.5)	19.2 (66.6)	20.3 (68.5)	16.0 (60.8)	9.0 (48.2)	2.7 (36.9)	−1.5 (29.3)	7.2 (45.0)
Record low °C (°F)	−17.6 (0.3)	−15.9 (3.4)	−12.1 (10.2)	−4.7 (23.5)	1.4 (34.5)	7.0 (44.6)	11.5 (52.7)	12.0 (53.6)	3.7 (38.7)	−1.4 (29.5)	−5.6 (21.9)	−15.9 (3.4)	−17.6 (0.3)
Average precipitation mm (inches)	44.9 (1.77)	35.0 (1.38)	70.4 (2.77)	82.7 (3.26)	102.8 (4.05)	123.3 (4.85)	169.9 (6.69)	139.1 (5.48)	160.4 (6.31)	129.2 (5.09)	62.8 (2.47)	53.1 (2.09)	1,173.5 (46.20)
Average snowfall cm (inches)	80 (31)	55 (22)	24 (9.4)	1 (0.4)	0 (0)	0 (0)	0 (0)	0 (0)	0 (0)	0 (0)	1 (0.4)	42 (17)	200 (79)
Average precipitation days (≥ 1.0 mm)	8.9	7.6	9.1	9.1	9.5	10.6	13.5	11.5	11.6	9.9	9.0	9.5	119.9
Mean monthly sunshine hours	130.8	148.7	176.3	190.7	192.3	147.8	124.8	141.3	125.1	137.2	131.7	115.4	1,762
Source: Japan Meteorological Agency (1991–2020 normals, extremes 1976–present)

Climate data for Kashimadai, Ōsaki (elevation 3 m, 1991–2020 normals, extremes 1976–present)
Month	Jan	Feb	Mar	Apr	May	Jun	Jul	Aug	Sep	Oct	Nov	Dec	Year
Record high °C (°F)	15.3 (59.5)	20.1 (68.2)	22.7 (72.9)	29.6 (85.3)	31.3 (88.3)	34.7 (94.5)	37.2 (99.0)	36.2 (97.2)	35.2 (95.4)	29.6 (85.3)	23.7 (74.7)	21.1 (70.0)	37.2 (99.0)
Mean daily maximum °C (°F)	4.5 (40.1)	5.5 (41.9)	9.3 (48.7)	15.1 (59.2)	19.8 (67.6)	22.9 (73.2)	26.3 (79.3)	27.9 (82.2)	24.8 (76.6)	19.5 (67.1)	13.2 (55.8)	7.2 (45.0)	16.4 (61.5)
Daily mean °C (°F)	0.3 (32.5)	0.8 (33.4)	3.9 (39.0)	9.1 (48.4)	14.7 (58.5)	18.7 (65.7)	22.2 (72.0)	23.5 (74.3)	20.0 (68.0)	14.0 (57.2)	7.6 (45.7)	2.5 (36.5)	11.4 (52.5)
Mean daily minimum °C (°F)	−4.1 (24.6)	−3.9 (25.0)	−1.7 (28.9)	3.0 (37.4)	10.1 (50.2)	15.2 (59.4)	19.2 (66.6)	20.2 (68.4)	15.8 (60.4)	8.7 (47.7)	2.2 (36.0)	−1.9 (28.6)	6.9 (44.4)
Record low °C (°F)	−17.3 (0.9)	−17.1 (1.2)	−13.4 (7.9)	−6.2 (20.8)	0.1 (32.2)	6.8 (44.2)	11.2 (52.2)	10.8 (51.4)	4.7 (40.5)	−2.1 (28.2)	−6.1 (21.0)	−17.9 (−0.2)	−17.9 (−0.2)
Average precipitation mm (inches)	35.1 (1.38)	29.2 (1.15)	72.2 (2.84)	84.7 (3.33)	95.1 (3.74)	119.4 (4.70)	155.4 (6.12)	129.3 (5.09)	166.7 (6.56)	143.7 (5.66)	62.7 (2.47)	41.0 (1.61)	1,134.5 (44.67)
Average precipitation days (≥ 1.0 mm)	5.3	5.2	7.6	8.5	9.4	10.1	13.1	10.6	11.6	9.0	7.0	6.5	104.0
Mean monthly sunshine hours	154.7	161.2	184.1	188.8	189.2	146.8	129.2	150.6	130.3	141.5	139.1	133.2	1,848.7
Source: Japan Meteorological Agency (1991–2020 normals, extremes 1976–present)

Climate data for Kawatabi, Ōsaki (elevation 170 m, 1991–2020 normals, extremes 1976–present)
Month	Jan	Feb	Mar	Apr	May	Jun	Jul	Aug	Sep	Oct	Nov	Dec	Year
Record high °C (°F)	14.5 (58.1)	17.5 (63.5)	21.3 (70.3)	28.2 (82.8)	33.4 (92.1)	34.2 (93.6)	36.7 (98.1)	36.5 (97.7)	35.5 (95.9)	29.4 (84.9)	22.8 (73.0)	18.8 (65.8)	36.7 (98.1)
Mean daily maximum °C (°F)	2.7 (36.9)	3.7 (38.7)	7.7 (45.9)	14.5 (58.1)	19.9 (67.8)	23.0 (73.4)	26.2 (79.2)	27.5 (81.5)	23.8 (74.8)	18.3 (64.9)	12.0 (53.6)	5.5 (41.9)	15.4 (59.7)
Daily mean °C (°F)	−0.9 (30.4)	−0.4 (31.3)	2.7 (36.9)	8.5 (47.3)	14.0 (57.2)	18.0 (64.4)	21.6 (70.9)	22.7 (72.9)	18.9 (66.0)	12.8 (55.0)	6.7 (44.1)	1.5 (34.7)	10.5 (50.9)
Mean daily minimum °C (°F)	−4.4 (24.1)	−4.3 (24.3)	−1.8 (28.8)	2.7 (36.9)	8.6 (47.5)	13.6 (56.5)	18.1 (64.6)	19.1 (66.4)	14.9 (58.8)	8.0 (46.4)	2.1 (35.8)	−2.1 (28.2)	6.2 (43.2)
Record low °C (°F)	−14.3 (6.3)	−13.9 (7.0)	−10.9 (12.4)	−5.7 (21.7)	0.0 (32.0)	4.2 (39.6)	7.9 (46.2)	10.6 (51.1)	2.8 (37.0)	−1.4 (29.5)	−5.7 (21.7)	−13.3 (8.1)	−14.3 (6.3)
Average precipitation mm (inches)	113.4 (4.46)	82.8 (3.26)	105.1 (4.14)	110.2 (4.34)	132.1 (5.20)	161.5 (6.36)	216.6 (8.53)	205.9 (8.11)	183.1 (7.21)	143.6 (5.65)	105.8 (4.17)	128.6 (5.06)	1,697 (66.81)
Average snowfall cm (inches)	144 (57)	115 (45)	61 (24)	4 (1.6)	0 (0)	0 (0)	0 (0)	0 (0)	0 (0)	0 (0)	7 (2.8)	85 (33)	407 (160)
Average precipitation days (≥ 1.0 mm)	17.3	14.6	13.8	11.9	11.1	11.7	15.2	14.3	13.6	12.1	13.6	17.8	167.7
Mean monthly sunshine hours	98.7	114.8	154.5	186.9	190.4	148.2	120.8	131.2	119.8	138.3	126.9	91.2	1,621.7
Source: Japan Meteorological Agency (1991–2020 normals, extremes 1976–present)

== Demographics ==
Per Japanese census data, the population of Ōsaki has remained relatively steady over the past 60 years.

Historical population
Year	Pop.	±%
1960	138,978	—
1970	126,057	−9.3%
1980	130,266	+3.3%
1990	135,208	+3.8%
2000	139,313	+3.0%
2010	135,147	−3.0%
2020	127,330	−5.8%

== History ==
The area of present-day Ōsaki was part of ancient Mutsu Province, and has been settled since at least the Jōmon period by the Emishi people. During the Nara period, gold was discovered in the area. During later portion of the Heian period, the area was ruled by the Northern Fujiwara. During the Sengoku period, the area was contested by various samurai clans before the area came under the control of the Date clan of Sendai Domain during the Edo period, under the Tokugawa shogunate.

The town of Furukawa was established with the creation of the modern municipalities system on April 1, 1889. It was raised to city status on December 15, 1950.

The city of Ōsaki was established on March 31, 2006, from the merger of the city of Furukawa with the towns of Iwadeyama and Naruko (both from Tamatsukuri District), the towns of Kashimadai, Matsuyama and Sanbongi (all from Shida District), and the town of Tajiri (from Tōda District).

== Government ==
Ōsaki has a mayor-council form of government with a directly elected mayor and a unicameral city legislature of 30 members. Ōsaki contributes four seats to the Miyagi Prefectural legislature. In terms of national politics, after the abolishment of the Miyagi 6th district in 2022, the city is part of Miyagi 5th district of the lower house of the Diet of Japan.

== Economy ==
The economy of Ōsaki is largely based on agriculture, primarily the cultivation of rice and soybeans. Industry includes electronics, precision machining and construction materials.

== Education ==
- Miyagi Seishin Junior College
- Ōsaki has 25 elementary public schools and 10 public junior high schools operated by the city government. There are five public high schools, and two combined public middle/high schools operated by the Miyagi Prefectural Board of Education and two private high schools and one combined private middle/high school. The prefecture also operates one special education school for the handicapped.

== Transportation ==
=== Railway ===
East Japan Railway Company (JR East) - Tōhoku Shinkansen

- Furukawa

East Japan Railway Company (JR East) - Tōhoku Main Line

- Kashimadai - Matsuyama-Machi - Tajiri

East Japan Railway Company (JR East) - Rikuu East Line

- Furukawa - Tsukanome - Nishi-Furukawa - Higashi-Ōsaki - Nishi-Ōsaki - Iwadeyama - Yūbikan - Kaminome - Ikezuki - Kawatabi-Onsen - Naruko-Gotenyu - Naruko-Onsen - Nakayamadaira-Onsen

=== Highway ===
- Tōhoku Expressway - Furukawa IC; Chōjahara PA
- National Route 4
- National Route 47
- National Route 108
- National Route 346
- National Route 347
- National Route 457

== Local attractions ==
- Daikichiyama Tile Kiln Site, National Historic Site
- Dewa Sendai Kaidō Nakayamagoe Pass, National Historic Site
- Kido Tile Kiln Site, National Historic Site
- Miyazawa Site, ruins of early Heian-period fort; National Historic Site
- Myōdate Kanga ruins, National Historic Site
- Nakazawame Shell Mound, National Historic Site
- Nippon Kokeshi Museum. as known well for museum at Miyagi Prefecture
- Yamahata Cave Tomb Cluster, National Historic Site
- Yūbikan, former Date clan school and gardens; registered National Historic Site and Place of Scenic Beauty

== Sister cities ==
- (United States) Middletown, Ohio, USA, since October 18, 1990
- Jinshui District, Zhengzhou, Henan Province, China, since July 19, 1994
- (United States) Dublin, Georgia, USA, since May 29, 1998

== Notable people from Ōsaki ==
- Ryōji Chūbachi, businessman
- Naoko Fujioka, female professional boxer
- Mao Inoue, professional wrestler
- Frank Nagai, singer
- Sakuzō Yoshino, author
- Shinji Yoshino, politician, cabinet minister
