= Miyagi Seishin Junior College =

Coordinates: 38°34′50.2″N 140°58′24″E

- 宮城誠真短期大学
- Type: Private
- Established: 1966
- Location: Ōsaki, Miyagi, Japan
- Website: http://miyagi-seishin.ac.jp/

Miyagi Seishin Junior College (宮城誠真短期大学, Miyagi seishin tanki daigaku) is a private women's junior college in Ōsaki, Miyagi, Japan. It was established in 1967. The predecessor of the school, a sewing school, was founded in 1881.
