= Sanbongi, Miyagi =

Dissolved municipality in Miyagi prefecture, Japan

Sanbongi (三本木町, Sanbongi-chō) was a town located in Shida District, Miyagi Prefecture, Japan.

In 2003, the town had an estimated population of 8,405 and a population density of 188.33 persons per km^{2}. The total area was 44.63 km^{2}.

On March 31, 2006, Sanbongi, along with the city of Furukawa, the towns of Iwadeyama and Naruko (both from Tamatsukuri District), the towns of Kashimadai and Matsuyama (all from Shida District), and the town of Tajiri (from Tōda District), was merged to create the city of Ōsaki. Tamatsukuri District and Shida District were dissolved as a result of this merger.
