= Naruko, Miyagi =

Dissolved town in Shida district, Miyagi prefecture, Japan

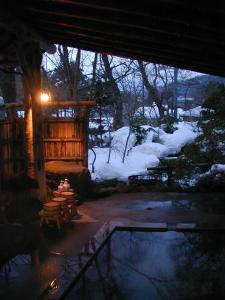
Mori-no-Yu outdoor bath at dusk

Naruko (鳴子町, Naruko-chō) was a town located in Tamatsukuri District, Miyagi Prefecture, Japan.

On March 31, 2006, Naruko, along with the city of Furukawa, the town of Iwadeyama (also from Tamatsukuri District), the towns of Kashimadai, Matsuyama and Sanbongi (all from Shida District), and the town of Tajiri (from Tōda District), to create the new city of Ōsaki. Tamatsukuri District and Shida District were dissolved as a result of this merger.

== Geography ==
Nestled in the mountainous backbone of Tōhoku region, Naruko is located entirely within the Kurikoma Quasi-National Park. Haiku poet Matsuo Bashō passed through the area on the trip that became his masterwork Oku no Hosomichi.

== Tourism and Sightseeing ==
The volcanically active area is famous for the Naruko Hot Spring Villages (鳴子温泉郷), a cluster of five villages—Naruko, East Naruko, Nakayamadaira, Kawatabi and Onikōbe—with abundant hot springs. The reputed curative properties of the springs make them especially popular with people in ill health. Several ski resorts also operate nearby in the winter.

Naruko is one among many places to claim to have originated the kokeshi, a cylindrical wooden doll emblematic of Tōhoku. The Japan Kokeshi Museum is located in Naruko, and some 80 craftsmen work full-time at the art today.

== Transport ==
Naruko is accessible by train on the JR East Rikuu East Line, some 40 minutes from Furukawa Station, where connections to Tokyo can be made via the Tōhoku Shinkansen. National Highways 47 and 108 also pass through the area.

== Demographics ==
In 2003, the town had an estimated population of 8,764 and a population density of 26.76 persons per km^{2}. The total area was 327.55 km^{2}.
