= Kogota, Miyagi =

Dissolved municipality in Miyagi prefecture, Japan

Coordinates: 38°33′N 141°03′E

Kogota (小牛田町, Kogota-chō) was a town located in Tōda District, Miyagi Prefecture, Japan.

In 2003, the town had an estimated population of 19,743 and a population density of 555.51 persons per km^{2}. The total area was 35.54 km^{2}.

== History ==
On January 1, 2006, Kogota, along with the town of Nangō (also from Tōda District), was merged to create the town of Misato and no longer exists as an independent municipality.

== Geography ==
The former town is situated in a rice growing area and serves as a shopping center for the surrounding area. The Naruse and Aikara rivers both flow through the former town.

== Main sights ==
Major landmarks in the area include the Yamanokami Shrine and various ancient burial mounds dating from before 250BC.

== Transport ==
Kogota Station connects the Tōhoku Main Line, Ishinomaki Line, and Rikuu East Line, all of the JR East railway network.

== Twin towns ==
Kogota was a sister city of:

- Winona (Minnesota, United States).
