= Rikuzen Province =

Old province of Japan

Map of the former Japanese provinces with Rikuzen highlighted

Rikuzen Province (陸前国, Rikuzen no Kuni; Japanese pronunciation: [ɾʲì.kɯ̈́.(d͡)zè̞ɴ̀, -(d͡)zè̞ǹ nò̞ kɯ̈̀.ɲ̟ì]) is an old province of Japan in the area of Miyagi Prefecture (excluding Igu, Katta and Watari Districts) and parts of Iwate Prefecture (specifically Kesen District). It was sometimes called Rikushū (陸州), with Rikuchū and Mutsu Provinces.

== History ==
- January 19, 1869: Rikuzen is separated from Mutsu Province.
- 1872: A census estimates the population at 534,609.

== Historical districts ==
Rikuzen Province consisted of fourteen districts:

- Iwate Prefecture
  - Kesen District (気仙郡)
- Miyagi Prefecture
  - Kami District (加美郡)
  - Kurihara District (栗原郡) - dissolved
  - Kurokawa District (黒川郡)
  - Miyagi District (宮城郡)
  - Monou District (桃生郡) - dissolved
  - Motoyoshi District (本吉郡)
  - Natori District (名取郡) - dissolved
  - Oshika District (牡鹿郡)
  - Shibata District (柴田郡)
  - Shida District (志田郡)- dissolved
  - Tamatsukuri District (玉造郡) - dissolved
  - Tōda District (遠田郡)
  - Tome District (登米郡) - dissolved

== See also ==
- Sanriku
- List of Provinces of Japan

== Other websites ==
Media related to Rikuzen Province at Wikimedia Commons

- Murdoch's map of provinces, 1903
