= Telephone numbers in Japan =

- Country: Japan
- Continent: Asia
- Numbering plan type: Closed
- Format: X-XXXX-XXXX; XX-XXX-XXXX; XXX-XX-XXXX; XXXX-X-XXXX
- Country code: 81
- International access: 010
- Long-distance: 0

Telephone numbers in Japan consist of an area code, an exchange number, and a subscriber number.

== Dialing prefixes ==
- 001, 00xx, 002xx, 0091xx Carrier selection prefix
- 184 Prefix to withhold caller ID
- 186 Prefix to provide caller ID

== Types of numbers ==
 1xx           Special numbers
 001 and 00xx  Carrier selection codes
 0x            2-digit geographic area codes
 0xx           3-digit geographic area codes
 0xxx          4-digit geographic area codes
 0xxxx         5-digit geographic area codes
 0x0           3-digit non-Geographic area codes (excluding 010)
 0xx0          4-digit non-Geographic area codes (01x0, 0570, 0800, 0910, 0990)

== Length of numbers ==
- Special numbers are three digits long
- Geographic numbers are ten digits long
- 0X0 Non-geographic numbers are 10 or 11 digits long
- 0XX0 Non-geographic numbers are 10 digits long

=== Three-digit numbers (special numbers) ===
==== Emergency services ====
 110  Police (112 and 911 redirect to 110 on mobile phones)
 118  Maritime emergencies
 119  Ambulance, Fire brigade
 171  Earthquake assistance

==== Operator services ====
 100  NTT operator
 106  Operator assisted collect call service
 108  Automated collect call service
 113  NTT technical faults hotline
 116  NTT customer service and general enquiries

==== Directory services ====
 104  NTT national directory enquiries
 0057 KDDI international directory enquiries

==== Special services ====
 114  Automated number-busy check
 115  Telegram service
 117  Speaking clock
 136  Information on last incoming call
 177  Weather forecast

=== Long-distance carrier selection (Myline) ===
 001   KDDI (international)
 0032  IPS Inc.
 0033  NTT Communications
 0034  NTT Communications (international toll free)
 0036  NTT East
 0037  Fusion Communications
 0039  NTT West
 0041  SoftBank Telecom (international / former Japan Telecom)
 0053  KDDI (Resold)
 0056  KDDI (international)
 0061  SoftBank Telecom (international / former Cable and Wireless IDC)
 0066  SoftBank Telecom (international / former Cable and Wireless IDC)
 0070  KDDI Toll Free
 0071  Verizon Japan
 0077  KDDI (national)
 0080  T-Systems
 0081  Fusion Communications (former TTNet)
 0088  SoftBank Telecom (national / former Japan Telecom)
 0089  T-Systems
 0091  Brastel

=== Ten-digit numbers ===
==== Non-geographic area codes ====
 0120 NTT Freedial, toll free services
 0130 Automated information services
 0140 Disaster relief Wireless communications
 0160 Disaster relief satellite communications
 0170 NTT Dengon Dial, chat line services
 0180 NTT Telegong, TV/Radio show feedback dial-in
 0180 NTT Teledome, automated information services
 0190 NTT Angel Line, automated directory services via PC/modem
 0190 NTT Annai Jozu, automated directory services via telephone
 0570 Navi Dial [ja]
 0800 Other toll free services
 020  Paging services (PDC) and data services (UMTS)
 030  Mobile telephony services (legacy systems, PDC, J-CDMA, UMTS) - currently not used
 040  Mobile telephony services (legacy systems, PDC, J-CDMA, UMTS) - currently not used
 050  IP telephony service (via internet service providers)
 060  Universal personal number services
 070  Mobile telephony and data services (PDC, J-CDMA, UMTS)
 080  Mobile telephony and data services (PDC, J-CDMA, UMTS)
 090  Mobile telephony and data services (PDC, J-CDMA, UMTS)
 0910 Private circuit access, local rate services
 0990 NTT DialQ2, premium rate services

==== Decommissioned area codes ====
 0150 formerly used for maritime wireless communications
 0450 formerly used for maritime wireless communications
 0750 formerly used for maritime wireless communications

==== Area codes (市外局番 "shigai-kyokuban") of selected major cities ====
 11  Sapporo
 138 Hakodate
 166 Asahikawa
 17-7　or 172 Aomori
 18-8 Akita
 19-6 Morioka
 22  Sendai
 23-6 Yamagata
 24-5 Fukushima
 24-6 Iwaki
 24-9 Kōriyama
 25  Niigata 
 26  Nagano
 27-2 Maebashi
 27-3 Takasaki
 28-6 Utsunomiya
 3   Tokyo (23 Special wards), Komae
 4-29 Tokorozawa
 4-70 Kamogawa
 4-71 Kashiwa
 42-6 Hachiōji
 42-7 Machida, Sagamihara
 43 　Chiba
 44  Kawasaki
 45  Yokohama
 466 Fujisawa
 46-8 Yokosuka
 47-3 Ichikawa, Matsudo
 47-4 (473 for west part of the city) Funabashi
 48-2 Kawaguchi
 48-6 or 48-7 or 48-8 Saitama
 48-9　Soka, Koshigaya
 49  Kawagoe
 52  Nagoya
 53  Hamamatsu
 53-2 Toyohashi
 54  Shizuoka
 55  Kofu
 564 Okazaki
 565 Toyota
 568 Kasugai
 569 Handa
 58  Gifu
 586 Ichinomiya
 592 Tsu, Yokkaichi
 6   Osaka, Higashiōsaka, Suita, Toyonaka, Amagasaki
 72-2 Sakai
 726 Takatsuki
 72-8 Hirakata
 73  Wakayama
 742 or 743 Nara
 75  Kyoto
 76-2 Kanazawa
 76-4 Toyama
 768 Suzu
 77-5 Ōtsu
 776 Fukui
 78  Kobe
 790 Kasai
 792 or 793 Himeji
 794 Kakogawa
 797 or 798 Nishinomiya, Takarazuka
 82  Hiroshima
 832 or 834 Shimonoseki
 839 Yamaguchi
 84  Fukuyama
 852 Matsue
 857 Tottori
 862 or 869 Okayama
 864 or 865 Kurashiki
 87 Takamatsu
 88-6 Tokushima
 88-8 Kochi
 89 Matsuyama
 92  Fukuoka
 93  Kitakyushu
 942 Kurume
 95-8 Nagasaki
 952 Saga
 956 Sasebo
 96  Kumamoto
 97  Ōita
 98-8 or 98-9  Naha
 981 or 98-5 Miyazaki
 99  Kagoshima

Geographic numbers are nine digits long, including the area code, but not including the leading zero. Consequently, densely populated areas have shorter area codes, while less populated areas have longer area codes. For example:

- 6 xxxx xxxx (Osaka)
- 75 xxx xxxx (Kyoto)
- 742 xx xxxx (Nara)
- 4992 x xxxx (Niijima island, Tokyo pref.)
- 82486 xxxx (Takano, Hiroshima pref.)

Area codes increase from north to south; Sapporo in Hokkaidō (the northernmost prefecture) has 11, and Setouchi's 99-73 is far to the south in Kagoshima. When the telephone system was devised, Okinawa was still under U.S. occupation, so when it was returned to Japan in 1972, its telephone numbers were squeezed between Miyazaki (98x) and Kagoshima (99x) and begin with 988, 989, and 980.

During the 1990s, when plans were being drawn up to amalgamate mid-sized cities and towns into larger municipalities, telephone numbering systems were merged in advance. For example, in Nara Prefecture:

- 7442 x xxxx Kashihara
- 7444 x xxxx Sakurai
- 74452 xxxx Takatori
- 74454 xxxx Asuka
- etc.

became:

- 744 2x xxxx Kashihara
- 744 4x xxxx Sakurai
- 744 52 xxxx Takatori
- 744 54 xxxx Asuka etc.

Many of these towns have in fact refused to merge, leaving callers with more digits to dial when making local calls. This is partially balanced by not having to dial an area code for the neighboring city.

== Area code as local brand naming ==
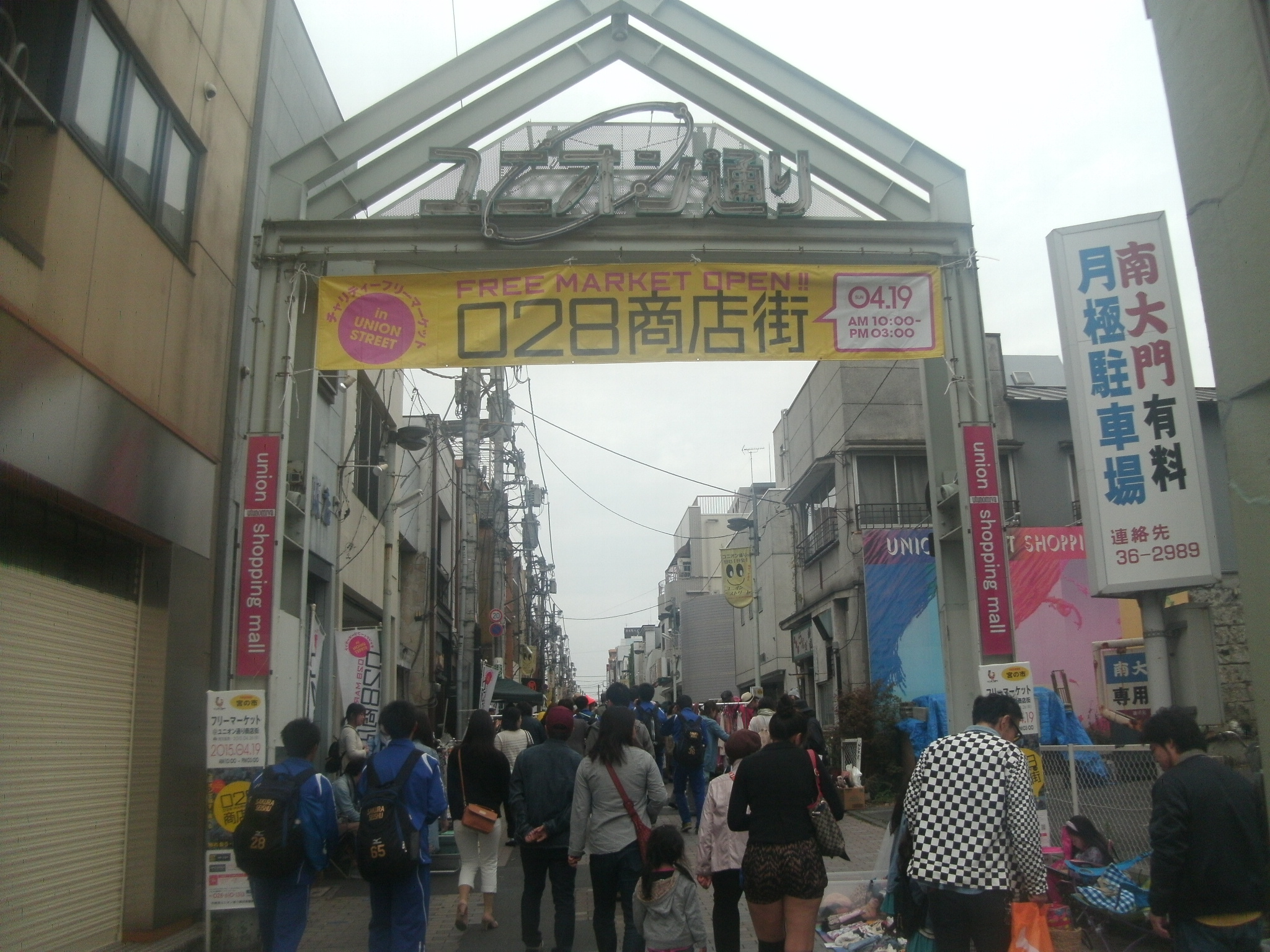
Flea market event named "028 Market" held on the Union St. in Utsunomiya. This event is held about semi-annually.

Starting in the 2010s, some local products and events are using names associated with the local area code.

0465net (Odawara, Kanagawa)
0428 T-shirt (Ōme, Tokyo)
028 Market (Utsunomiya, Tochigi)
028 Machinaka (Inner-City) Wi-Fi (Utsunomiya, Tochigi)
Bar 053 (Hamamatsu, Shizuoka)

== See also ==
- List of dialing codes in Japan
- Communications in Japan § Telephone services
- List of telephone operating companies § Japan
- Telephone numbering plan
