= Kashimadai, Miyagi =

Dissolved municipality in Shida district, Miyagi prefecture, Japan

Kashimadai (鹿島台町, Kashimadai-machi) was a town located in Shida District, Miyagi Prefecture, Japan.

In 2003, the town had an estimated population of 13,733 and a population density of 254.08 persons per km^{2}. The total area was 54.05 km^{2}.

On March 31, 2006, Kashimadai, along with the city of Furukawa, the towns of Iwadeyama and Naruko (both from Tamatsukuri District), the towns of Matsuyama and Sanbongi (all from Shida District), and the town of Tajiri (from Tōda District), was merged to create the city of Ōsaki. Tamatsukuri District and Shida District were dissolved as a result of this merger.

The town has one junior high school (chugakko), two elementary schools (shogakko), and numerous nursery schools. It is on the Tohoku Main Line of JR East, north of Sendai and south of Kogota. Tourist attractions in the town include the Michinoku hotspring facility, serviced by the town's mini bus service, as well as numerous hiking trails. The town's Poru Paru recreation centre has basketball courts, a workout room, tennis court and numerous other sports. Poru Paru is also the location of the Kamata Sannosuke museum, commemorating the former mayor who founded the town. There is also the Chou Baseball stadium next to Poru Paru.
