= Iwadeyama, Miyagi =

Dissolved municipality in Miyagi prefecture, Japan

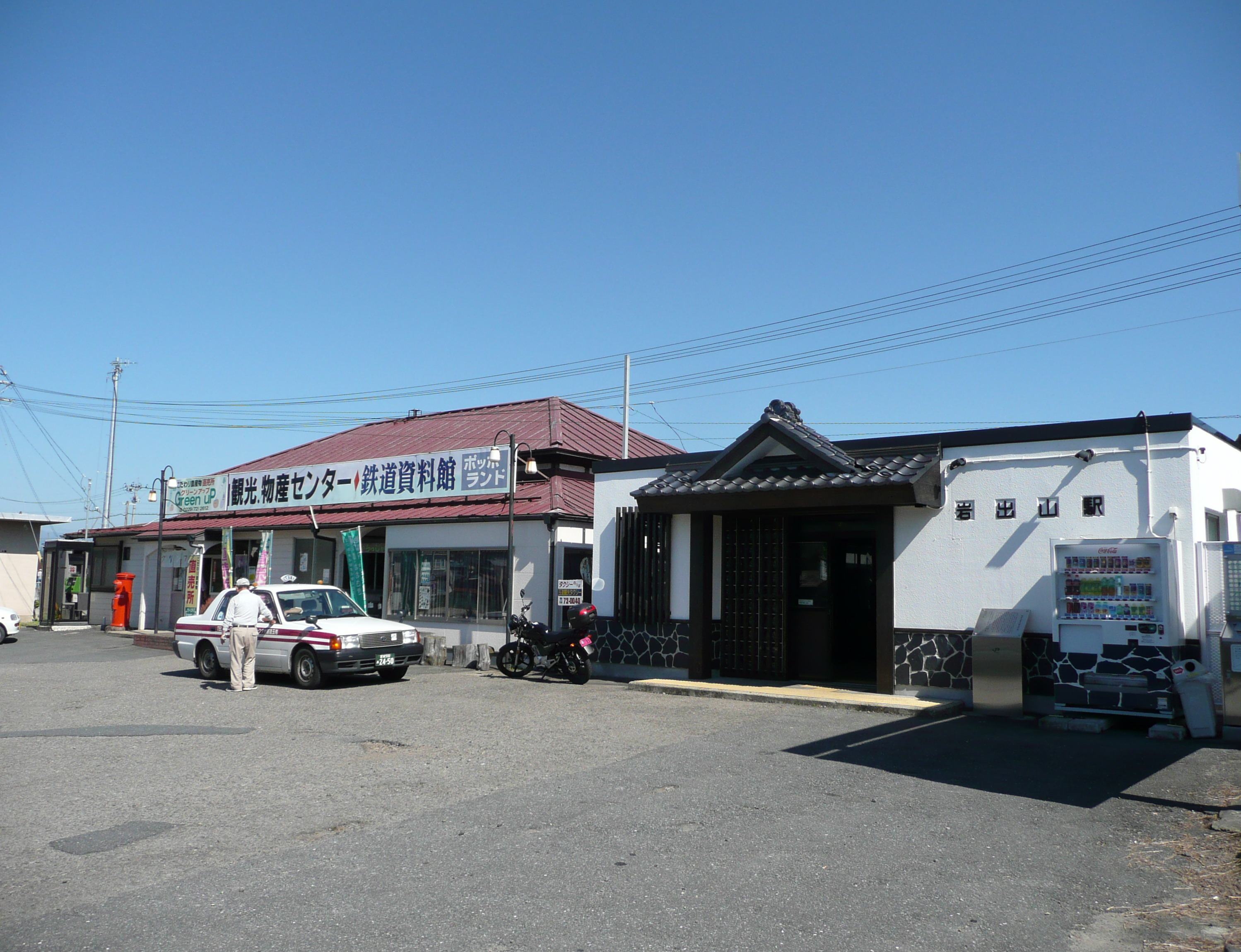
Iwadeyama Station

Iwadeyama (岩出山町, Iwadeyama-machi) was a town located in Tamatsukuri District, Miyagi Prefecture, Japan.

In 2003, the town had an estimated population of 13,476 and a population density of 95.78 persons per km^{2}. The total area was 140.70 km^{2}.

On March 31, 2006, Iwadeyama, along with the city of Furukawa, the town of Naruko (also from Tamatsukuri District), the towns of Kashimadai, Matsuyama and Sanbongi (all from Shida District), and the town of Tajiri (from Tōda District), was merged to create the city of Ōsaki. Tamatsukuri District and Shida District were dissolved as a result of this merge.
