= Tajiri (surname) =

Tajiri (written: 田尻 lit. "end of a field") is a Japanese surname. Notable people with the surname include:

- Satoshi Tajiri, creator of Pokémon
- Shinkichi Tajiri, Japanese-American artist and photographer
- Yoshihiro Tajiri, professional wrestler
- Yūji Tajiri, Japanese director
