= Kesen District, Iwate =

District in Iwate Prefecture, Japan

Coordinates: 39.176°N 141.535°E

- List of Provinces of Japan > Tōsandō > Rikuzen Province > Kesen District
- Japan > Tōhoku region > Iwate Prefecture > Kesen District

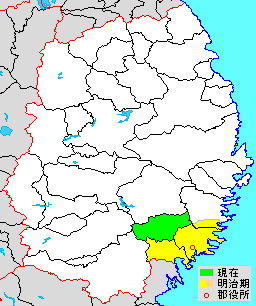
Map showing original extent of Kesen District in Iwate Prefecture colored area=original extent in Meiji period; green=present area

Kesen (気仙郡, Kesen-gun) is a rural district in Iwate Prefecture, in the Tōhoku region of northern Japan.

Formerly, the area of the cities of Rikusentakata and Ōfunato were within the borders of the district. As of 1 June 2019 the district consists only of the town of Sumita with a population of 5,228 people, with a density of 15.6 per km^{2} and an area of 334.84 square kilometres (129.28 sq mi).

== History ==
During the Edo period under the Tokugawa shogunate, the district was within Mutsu Province and was under the control of the Date clan of the Sendai Domain. In 1869, following the Meiji restoration, Mutsu Province was divided, with the area of Kesen District becoming part of Rikuchū Province, and from 1872, part of Iwate Prefecture.

On April 1, 1889, with the establishment of the municipalities system, the district was organized into two towns (Sakari and Takata) and 20 villages.

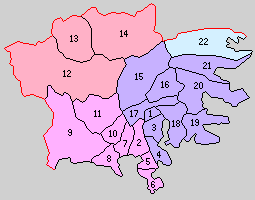
1. Sakari; 2. Yonesaki; 3. Ōfunato; 4. Massaki; 5. Otomo; 6. Hirota; 7. Takata; 8. Kesen; 9. Yasaku: 10. Takekoma; 11. Yokota; 12. Setamai; 13. Shimoarisu; 14. Kamiarisu; 15. Hikoroichi; 16. Takkon; 17. Ikawa: 18. Akasaki; 19. Ryōri; 20. Okirai; 21. Yoshihama; 22. Tōni; Purple = Ōfunato City; Orange= Sumita Town; Pink = Rikuzentakata Town; Blue = Kamaishi City

=== Subsequent timeline ===
- November 1, 1926 - The village of Kesen elevated to town status (3 towns, 19 villages)
- April 1, 1932 - The village of Ōfunato raised to town status. (4 towns, 18 villages)
- April 29, 1940 - The village of Setamai raised to town status. (5 towns, 17 villages)
- April 1, 1952 - The towns of Ōfunato and Sakari and the villages of Akasaki, Ikawa, Takkon, Hikoroichi and Massaki merge to form the city of Ōfunato. (3 towns, 12 villages)
- June 1, 1952 - The village of Hirota raised to town status. (4 towns, 11 villages)
- January 1, 1955 – The towns of Takata, Kesen and Hirota and the villages of Otomo, Takekoma, Yasaki, Yokota, and Yonesaki merged to form the city of Rikuzentakata. (1 town, 6 villages)
- April 1, 1955 - The town of Setamai and the villages of Shimoarisu and Kamiarisu merged to form the town of Sumita (1 town, 4 villages)
- April 1, 1955 - The village of Tōni annexed by the city of Kamaishi. (1 town, 3 villages)
- September 30, 1956 - The villages of Okirai, Yoshihama, and Ryōri merged to form the village of Sanriku. (1 town, 1 village)
- April 1, 1967 – The village of Sanriku raised to town status (2 towns)
- November 15, 2001: The town of Sanriku is annexed by the city of Ōfunato. (1 town)
