= Furukawa, Miyagi =

Dissolved municipality in Miyagi prefecture, Japan

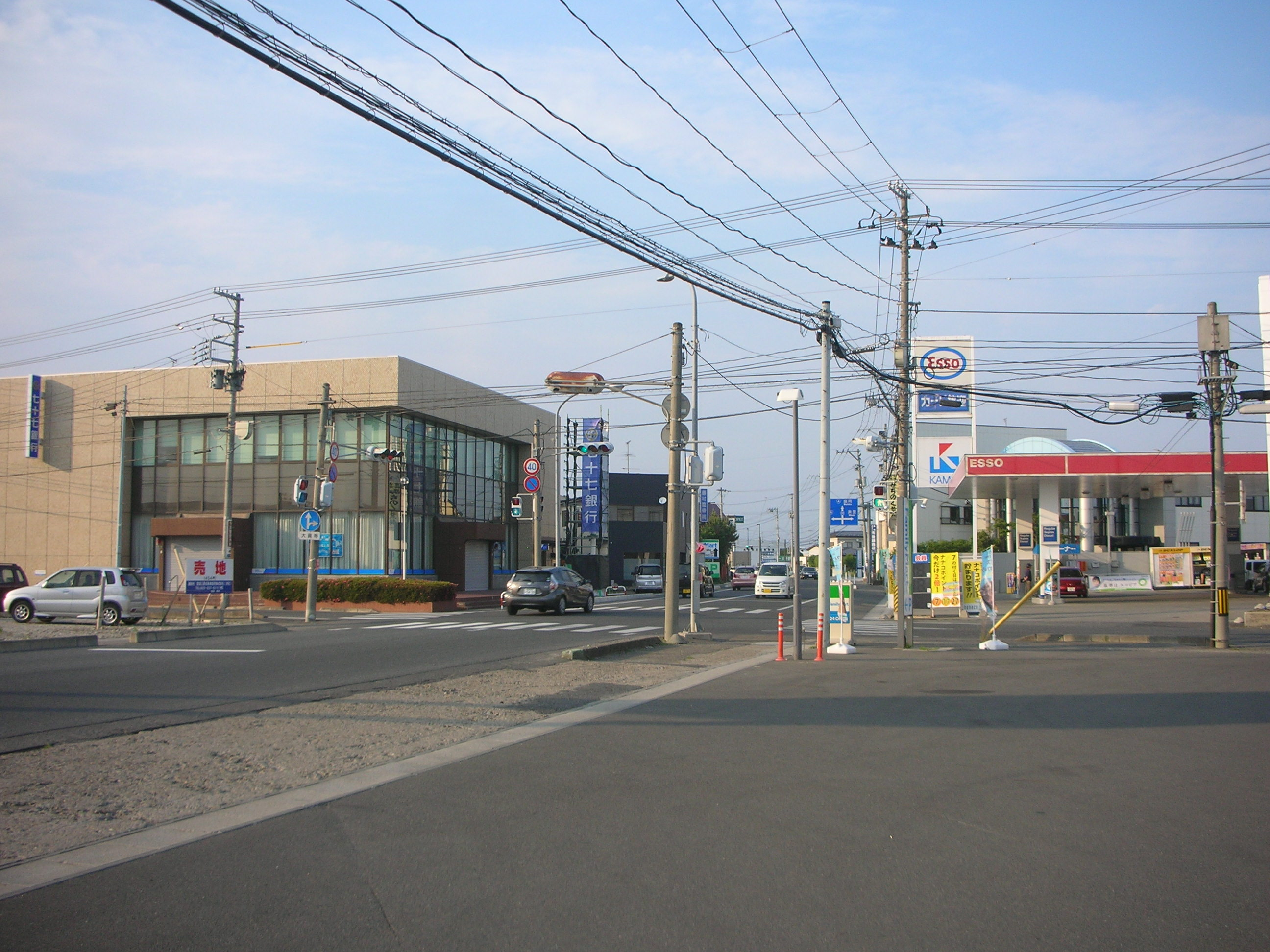
Furukawa

Furukawa (古川市, Furukawa-shi) was a city located in Miyagi Prefecture, Japan. In 2003, the city had an estimated population of 73,980 and a population density of 551.51 persons per km^{2}. The total area was 134.14 km^{2}.

The city was founded on December 15, 1950.

On March 31, 2006, Furukawa, along with the towns of Iwadeyama and Naruko (both from Tamatsukuri District), the towns of Kashimadai, Matsuyama and Sanbongi (all from Shida District), and the town of Tajiri (from Tōda District), to create the new city of Ōsaki. Tamatsukuri District and Shida District were dissolved as a result of this merger.
