= Miyagi District =

District in Miyagi prefecture, Japan

Coordinates: 38.372°N 141.036°E

Miyagi District (宮城郡, Miyagi-gun) is a district located in former Mutsu Province and today's Miyagi Prefecture, Japan. The name of the prefecture was from this district.

The original territory was east–west long from the Ōu Mountains to the Pacific Ocean, including current Sendai, Shiogama, and Tagajō cities. As of 2003, the district has an estimated population of 69,567 and a density of 620.80 persons per km^{2}. The total area is 112.06 km^{2}.

== History ==
The Minami-Koizumi site had been a village or town site since the fifth century A.D. Miyagi District first appeared in historical documents occurred in 766, in the Shoku Nihongi. Archaeologists presume that Miyagi District was established by eighth century, based on the presence of square field system remains between Hirose River and Nanakita River. The province capital of Mutsu was moved to Taga (modern Tagajō) from the Koriyam site of Natori District in 724. Its residential area extended beyond the wall of Taga. In 785, Taga District and Shinakami District were separated from Miyagi, but later annexed.

Taga continued to be the capital in the Kamakura period, but the city center moved to west Iwakiri. In 1190 Isawa Iekage was appointed as the Governor Acting in Absence of Mutsu Province, charged with restoring order after the Revolt of Ōkawa Kanetō. His descendants established a fiefdom around Taga and changed their name to Rusu, which means, literally, acting in absence.

In the Nanboku-chō period of 14th century, Taga was the object of military campaigns between the South and North Courts. The Rusu family occupied the northernmost part of the district, where Taga was located. The fate of the Rusu family had been easily swung by the battles between governors of Mutsu (Ōshū). The Mutsu were strong generals sent from central government, or shogunate. In addition to the Rusu, some samurai clans were known in southern and western parts of the district, including Ōkōchi, tenacious warriors for the Southern Court; Kokubun, the lord around the provincial temple (Kukubun-ji) of Mutsu; Hachiman clan, descendants of a past vice-governor of Mutsu.

A long war broke the unity of Mutsu and the function of its capital. After the governor Ōsaki left, the rule of the district was divided by Rusu and Kokubun, who struggled against each other. Eventually the Date clan's influence reached to Miyagi and the clan sent to its children as child-in-law and successors of the heads of families. Then Rusu Masakage and Kokubun Morishige became commanders of Date Masamune, fought many battles for the Date's dominance over Tohoku region. The two held only nominal independence from Date, solely to placate the retainers of the families.

When Masamune surrendered to the new shogun Toyotomi Hideyoshi in 1590, Rusu was abandoned and Kokubun was formally regarded a subject of Date. Miyagi District became a part of the territory of Date clan. In 1600, just after the Battle of Sekigahara, Masamune decided to build and move to the Sendai Castle in Miyagi District. After that the district was developed as the suburb of new Sendai town. Sendai town has been ruled as a different area from the rest since then.

The Meiji government divided Mutsu Province into three parts in 1869. Miyagi District became part of Rikuzen Province. The population in 1889 (excluding Sendai) was 60,518.

In March 2011, exactly ten years ago, an earthquake and tsunami hit this region of Japan.

== Towns and villages ==
- Matsushima
- Rifu
- Shichigahama

== Bibliography ==
- Committee for Editing the Miyagi Prefecture History (under Miyagi Prefecture), Miyagi Prefecture History, vol.2, Gyōsei, reprinted in 1987. (original version was published in 1956). 宮城県史編纂委員会『宮城県史』（2、近世史）、ぎょうせい。
