= Shibata District, Miyagi =

District in Miyagi prefecture, Japan

Coordinates: 38.186°N 140.647°E

- List of Provinces of Japan > Tōsandō > Rikuzen Province > Shibata District
- Japan > Tōhoku region > Miyagi Prefecture > Shibata District

Shibata (柴田郡, Shibata-gun) is a district located in Miyagi Prefecture, Japan.

== Population ==
As of 2025, the district has an estimated population of 76,708 and a population density of 179.2 persons per km^{2}. The total area is 428.20 km^{2}.

== Towns and villages ==
It comprises the following towns:

- Kawasaki
- Murata
- Ōgawara
- Shibata
