= Tajiri, Miyagi =

Town in Miyagi Prefecture, Japan

Tajiri 田尻町
- Town
- Interactive map of Tajiri
- Country: Japan
- Prefecture: Miyagi
- District: Tōda District

Government
  - Type: Town Government

Area
  - Total: 65.59 km^{2} (25.32 sq mi)
  - Land: 65.59 km^{2} (25.32 sq mi)
  - Water: 0 km^{2} (0 sq mi)

Population (2003)
  - Total: 13,023
  - Density: 198.55/km^{2} (514.2/sq mi)
- Time zone: UTC+9:00 (JST)
- ISO 3166 code: JP-04

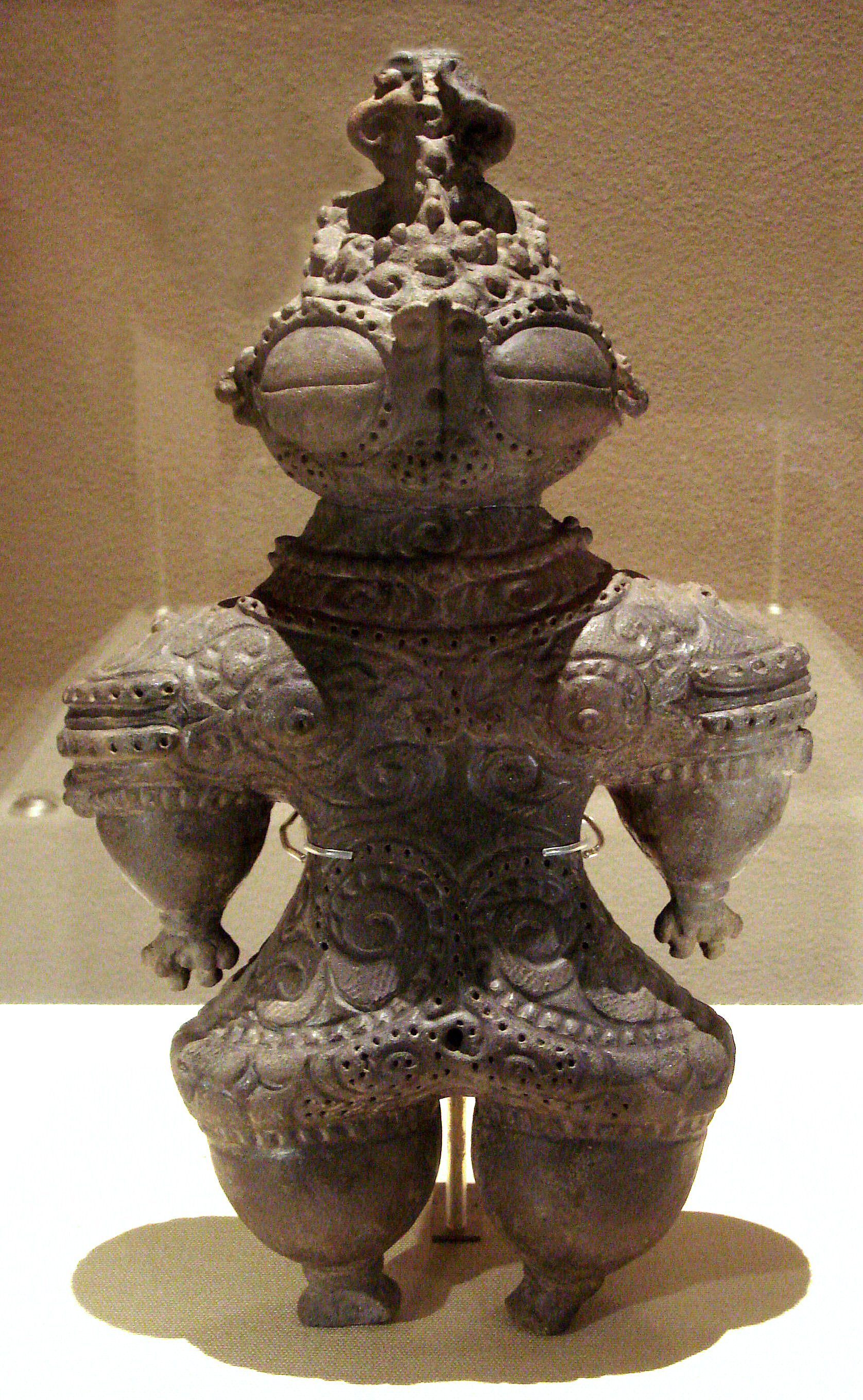
Dogū from the Ebisuda Site in Tajiri, 1000-400 BCE

Tajiri (田尻町, Tajiri-chō) was a town located in Tōda District, Miyagi Prefecture, Japan.

In 2003, the town had an estimated population of 13,023 and a population density of 198.55 persons per km². The total area was 65.59 km². The primary industry was rice farming. There was also a chemical plant.

On March 31, 2006, Tajiri, along with the city of Furukawa, the towns of Iwadeyama and Naruko (both from Tamatsukuri District), and the towns of Kashimadai, Matsuyama and Sanbongi (all from Shida District), was merged to create the city of Ōsaki. Tamatsukuri District and Shida District were dissolved as a result of this merger.
