= Tamatsukuri District, Miyagi =

Former district in Miyagi prefecture, Japan

- List of Provinces of Japan > Tōsandō > Rikuzen Province > Tamatsukuri District
- Japan > Tōhoku region > Miyagi Prefecture > Tamatsukuri District

Tamatsukuri (玉造郡, Tamatsukuri-gun) was a district located in Miyagi, Japan.

As of 2003, the district had an estimated population of 22,240 and a density of 47.50 persons per km^{2}. The total area was 468.25 km^{2}.

On March 31, 2006, the towns of Iwadeyama and Naruko were merged with the city of Furukawa, the towns of Kashimadai, Matsuyama and Sanbongi (all from Shida District), and the town of Tajiri (from Tōda District) to create the city of Ōsaki. Tamatsukuri District and Shida District were dissolved as a result of this merger.

== Former towns and villages ==
- Iwadeyama
- Naruko

== History ==
- 713 - Nitori District (丹取郡) was established. In 728 it was changed to Tamatsukuri.
- 1871 - With the Abolition of the han system, Tamakatsuri District becomes Ichinoseki Prefecture (一関県). That same year, it is renamed Mizusawa Prefecture (水沢県)
- 1873 - Misawa Prefecture renamed Iwai Prefecture (磐井県)
- 1876 - Tamakatsuri District becomes part of Miyagi Prefecture.
- 1889 - With the establishment of the municipal system, the Town of Iwadeyama (岩出山町) and the villages of Ōsaki (大崎村), Ichikuri (一栗村), Mayama (真山村), Onsen (温泉村), and Onikōbe (鬼首村) are established
- 1894 - District office is established in Iwadeyama
- 1921 - Onsen Village divided, becoming Naruko Town (鳴子町) and Kawatabi Village (川渡村)
- 1926 - District offices eliminated
- 1954 - Naruko Town, Kawatabi Village, and Onikōbe Village merge to form new Naruko Town.
- 1954 - Iwadeyama Town, Ichikuri Village, Mayama Village and West Ōsaki Village merge to form new Iwadeyama Town
- 2006 - the towns of Iwadeyama and Naruko were merged with the city of Furukawa, the towns of Kashimadai, Matsuyama and Sanbongi (all from Shida District), and the town of Tajiri (from Tōda District) to create the city of Ōsaki. Tamatsukuri District and Shida District were dissolved as a result of this merger.
