= Shida District, Miyagi =

Former district of Japan

- List of Provinces of Japan > Tōsandō > Rikuzen Province > Shida District
- Japan > Tōhoku region > Miyagi Prefecture > Shida District

Shida (志田郡, Shida-gun) was a district located in Miyagi Prefecture, Japan.

As of 2003, the district had an estimated population of 29,126 and a density of 226.17 inhabitants per square kilometer (585.8/sq mi). The total area was 128.78 km^{2} (49.72 sq mi).

On March 31, 2006, the towns of Kashimadai, Matsuyama and Sanbongi were merged with the city of Furukawa, the towns of Iwadeyama and Naruko (both from Tamatsukuri District), and the town of Tajiri (from Tōda District) to create the city of Ōsaki. Tamatsukuri District and Shida District were dissolved as a result of this merger.

== Former towns and villages ==
- Kashimadai
- Matsuyama
- Sanbongi

== History ==
- April, 1869 - Shida District is added to Wakuya Prefecture (涌谷県)
- August, 1869 - Wakuya Prefecture becomes Toyone Prefecture (登米県)
- 1871 - With the Abolition of the han system, becomes attached to Sendai Prefecture (仙台県), now Miyagi Prefecture
- 1889 - With the establishment of the modern municipal system, Furukawa Town (古川町), Arao? Village (荒雄村), Shida Village (志田村), Shikitama? Village (敷玉村), Takakura? Village (高倉村), Matsuyama Village (松山村), Shimoibano Village (下伊場野村), Sambongi Village (三本木村), and Kashimadai Village (鹿島台村) established
- 1890 - Matsuyama becomes a town
- 1894 - District offices established in Furukawa Town
- 1895 - Sambongi becomes a town
- 1926 - District offices abolished
- 1950 - Furukawa becomes a city (Furukawa, Miyagi)
- 1951 - Kashimadai becomes a town
- March 31, 2006 - the towns of Kashimadai, Matsuyama and Sanbongi were merged with the city of Furukawa, the towns of Iwadeyama and Naruko (both from Tamatsukuri District), and the town of Tajiri (from Tōda District) to create the city of Ōsaki. Tamatsukuri District and Shida District were dissolved as a result of this merger.
