= Nangō, Miyagi =

Dissolved municipality in Miyagi prefecture, Japan

Nangō (南郷町, Nangō-chō) was a town located in Tōda District, Miyagi Prefecture, Japan.

In 2003, the town had an estimated population of 6,887 and a population density of 174.27 persons per km^{2}. The total area was 39.52 km^{2}.
