= Tōda District, Miyagi =

District in Miyagi prefecture, Japan

Coordinates: 38.537°N 141.137°E

- List of Provinces of Japan > Tōsandō > Rikuzen Province > Tōda District
- Japan > Tōhoku region > Miyagi Prefecture > Tōda District

Tōda (遠田郡, Tōda-gun) is a district located in Miyagi Prefecture, Japan.

As of the Tajiri merger but with 2003 population estimates, the district had an estimated population of 45,374 and a population density of 289 persons per km^{2}. The total area is 157.14 km^{2}.

== Towns and villages ==
- Misato
- Wakuya

== History ==
- April 1869 Tōda District attached to Wakuya Prefecture (涌谷県)
- August 1869 Attached to Toyone? Prefecture (登米県)
- 1871 With the Abolition of the han system, Tōda District is attached to Sendai Prefecture (modern Miyagi Prefecture)
- 1889 With the establishment of municipal system, Wakuya Village (涌谷村), Motowakuya? Village (元涌谷村), Nonotake Village (箟岳村), Tajiri? Village (田尻村), Numabe Village (沼部村), Ōnuki? Village (大貫村), Kogota Village (小牛田村), Fudōdō Village? (不動堂村), Nakazone Village (中埣村), Kitaura Village (北浦村), Nangō Village (南郷村), Tominaga? Village (富永村) established
- 1894 District Offices established in Wakuya Town
- 1907 Kogota becomes a town
- 1926 District Offices abolished
- 1954 Kogota Town, Fudōdō Village, Kitaura Village, Nakazone Village, Shikitama Village merge to form Kogota Town
- 1954 Tajiri Town, Numabe Village, Ōnuk Village merge to form Tajiri Town
- 1954 Nangō becomes town
- 1955 Wakuya Town, Nanotake Village merge to form Wakuya Town
- January 1, 2006 Nangō and Kogota merged to form Misato.
- March 31, 2006 Tajiri is absorbed in the formation of Ōsaki.
