= Iwadeyama Station =

Railway station in Ōsaki, Miyagi Prefecture, Japan

Iwadeyama Station 岩出山駅
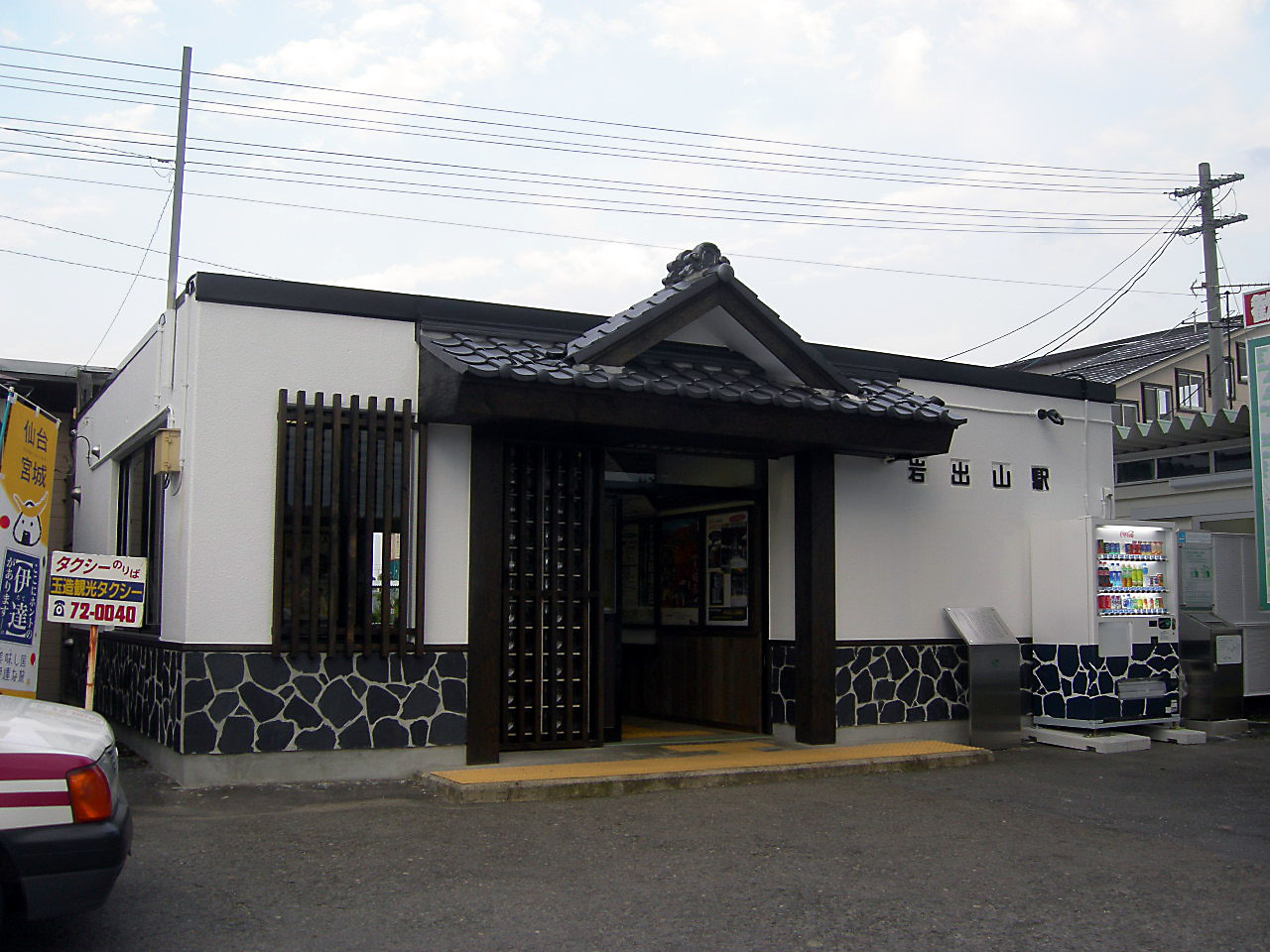
- Iwadeyama Station in October 2008

General information
- Location: Iwadeyama-aze Higashi-Kawahara 84, Ōsaki-shi, Miyagi-ken 989-6471; Japan
- Coordinates: 38.6526°N 140.8713°E
- Operator: JR East
- Line: ■ Rikuu East Line
- Distance: 24.8 km from Kogota
- Platforms: 1 island platform
- Tracks: 2

Construction
- Structure type: At grade

Other information
- Status: Staffed (Midori no Madoguchi)
- Website: Official website

History
- Opened: 20 April 1913

Passengers
- FY2016: 210

Services
Preceding station	JR East	Following station
Yūbikan towards Shinjō	Rikuu East Line	Nishi-Ōsaki towards Kogota
Location
- Location within Japan

Iwadeyama Station (岩出山駅, Iwadeyama-eki) is a railway station on the Rikuu East Line in the city of Ōsaki, Miyagi Prefecture, Japan, operated by East Japan Railway Company (JR East).

== Lines ==
Iwadeyama Station is served by the Rikuu East Line, and is located 24.8 rail kilometers from the terminus of the line at Kogota Station.

== Station layout ==
Iwadeyama Station has one island platform, connected to the station building by a level crossing. The station is staffed.

=== Platforms ===
1	■ Rikuu East Line	for Mogami and Shinjō
2	■ Rikuu East Line	for Furukawa and Kogota

== History ==
Iwadeyama Station opened on 20 April 1913. The station was absorbed into the JR East network upon the privatization of JNR on 1 April 1987.

== Passenger statistics ==
In fiscal 2016, the station was used by an average of 210 passengers daily (boarding passengers only).

== Surrounding area ==
- Japan National Route 47
- Yūbikan
- Site of Iwadeyama Castle

== See also ==
- List of railway stations in Japan
