= Ikezuki Station =

Railway station in Ōsaki, Miyagi Prefecture, Japan

Ikezuki Station 池月駅
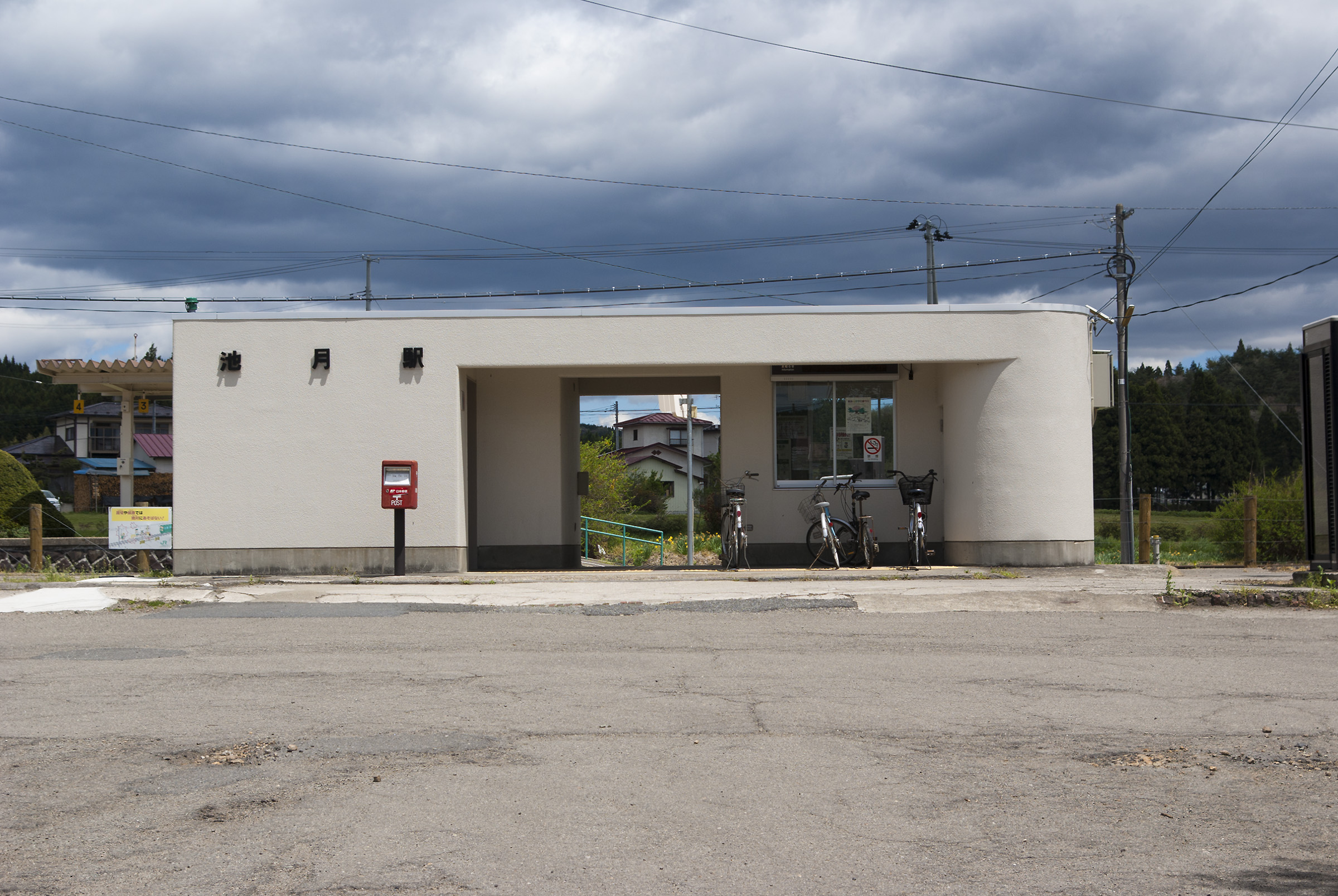
- Ikezuki Station in May 2005

General information
- Location: Iwadeyama-Ikezuki-aze Shimomiya Shirayama 30, Ōsaki-shi, Miyagi-ken 989-6405; Japan
- Coordinates: 38.7090°N 140.8356°E
- Operator: JR East
- Line: ■ Rikuu East Line
- Distance: 32.4 km from Kogota
- Platforms: 1 island platform
- Tracks: 2

Construction
- Structure type: At grade

Other information
- Status: Unstaffed
- Website: Official website

History
- Opened: 19 April 1914

Services
| Preceding station | JR East | Following station |
|---|---|---|
| Kawatabi-Onsen towards Shinjō | Rikuu East Line | Kaminome towards Kogota |
Location
- Location within Japan

Ikezuki Station (池月駅, Ikezuki-eki) is a railway station on the Rikuu East Line in the city of Ōsaki, Miyagi Prefecture, Japan, operated by East Japan Railway Company (JR East).

== Lines ==
Ikezuki Station is served by the Rikuu East Line, and is located 32.4 rail kilometers from the terminus of the line at Kogota Station.

== Station layout ==
Ikezuki Station has one island platform, connected to the station building by a level crossing. The station is unattended.

=== Platforms ===
| 1 | ■ Rikuu East Line | for Mogami and Shinjō |
| 2 | ■ Rikuu East Line | for Furukawa and Kogota |

== History ==
Ikezuki Station opened on 19 April 1914. The station was absorbed into the JR East network upon the privatization of JNR on April 1, 1987.

== Surrounding area ==
- Japan National Route 47
- Japan National Route 457
- Ikezuki Post Office

== See also ==
- List of railway stations in Japan
