= Kawatabi-Onsen Station =

Railway station in Ōsaki, Miyagi Prefecture, Japan

Kawatabi-Onsen Station 川渡温泉駅
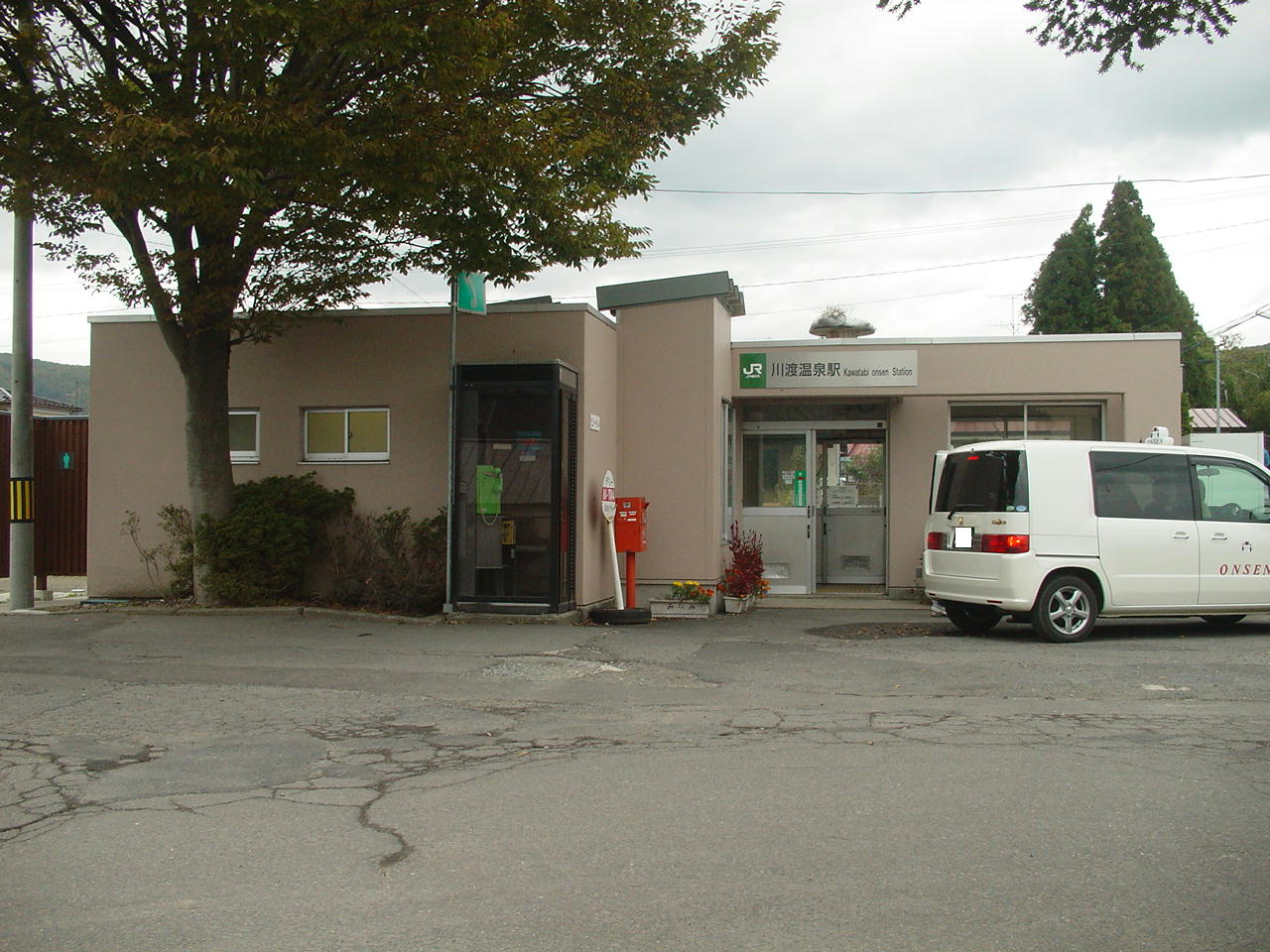
- Kawatabi-Onsen Station in October 2007

General information
- Location: Naruko-Onsen-aze Tanaka 1, Ōsaki-shi, Miyagi-ken 989-6100; Japan
- Coordinates: 38.7367°N 140.7795°E
- Operator: JR East
- Line: ■ Rikuu East Line
- Distance: 38.8 km from Kogota
- Platforms: 1 island platform
- Tracks: 2

Construction
- Structure type: At grade

Other information
- Status: Unstaffed
- Website: Official website

History
- Opened: 19 April 1914
- Former names: Kawatabi (to 1997)

Services
Preceding station	JR East	Following station
Naruko-Gotenyu towards Shinjō	Rikuu East Line	Ikezuki towards Kogota
Location
- Location within Japan

Kawatabi-Onsen Station (川渡温泉駅, Kawatabi-Onsen-eki) is a railway station on the Rikuu East Line in the city of Ōsaki, Miyagi Prefecture, Japan, operated by East Japan Railway Company (JR East).

== Lines ==
Kawatabi-Onsen Station is served by the Rikuu East Line, and is located 38.8 rail kilometers from the terminus of the line at Kogota Station.

== Station layout ==
Kawatabi-Onsen Station has one island platform, connected to the station building by a level crossing.

=== Platforms ===
1	■ Rikuu East Line	for Mogami and Shinjō
2	■ Rikuu East Line	for Furukawa and Kogota

== History ==
Kawatabi-Onsen Station opened on 19 April 1914 as Kawatabi Station (川渡駅). The station was absorbed into the JR East network upon the privatization of JNR on April 1, 1987. The station was renamed to its present name on 22 March 1997.

== Surrounding area ==
- Japan National Route 47
- Kawatabi Onsen
- Kawatabi Post Office

== See also ==
- List of railway stations in Japan
