= Mogami =

Mogami can refer to:

- Mogami District, Yamagata - a district in northern Yamagata Prefecture, Japan
- Mogami, Yamagata - a town in Mogami District
- Mogami clan
- Mogami River - a river in Yamagata Prefecture
- Mogami Station - JR East railway station in Mogami, Yamagata
- Japanese cruiser Mogami (1908) - a dispatch vessel of the early Imperial Japanese Navy
- Japanese cruiser Mogami (1934) - a World War II heavy cruiser in the Imperial Japanese Navy and lead ship of the Mogami-class
- JDS Mogami (DE-212) - an Isuzu-class destroyer escort launched in 1961 and stricken in 1991.
- JS Mogami (FFM-1) - a Mogami-class frigate launched in 2021.
- Tohru Mogami, Japanese engineer
