= Nishi-Furukawa Station =

Railway station in Ōsaki, Miyagi Prefecture, Japan

Nishi-Furukawa Station 西古川駅
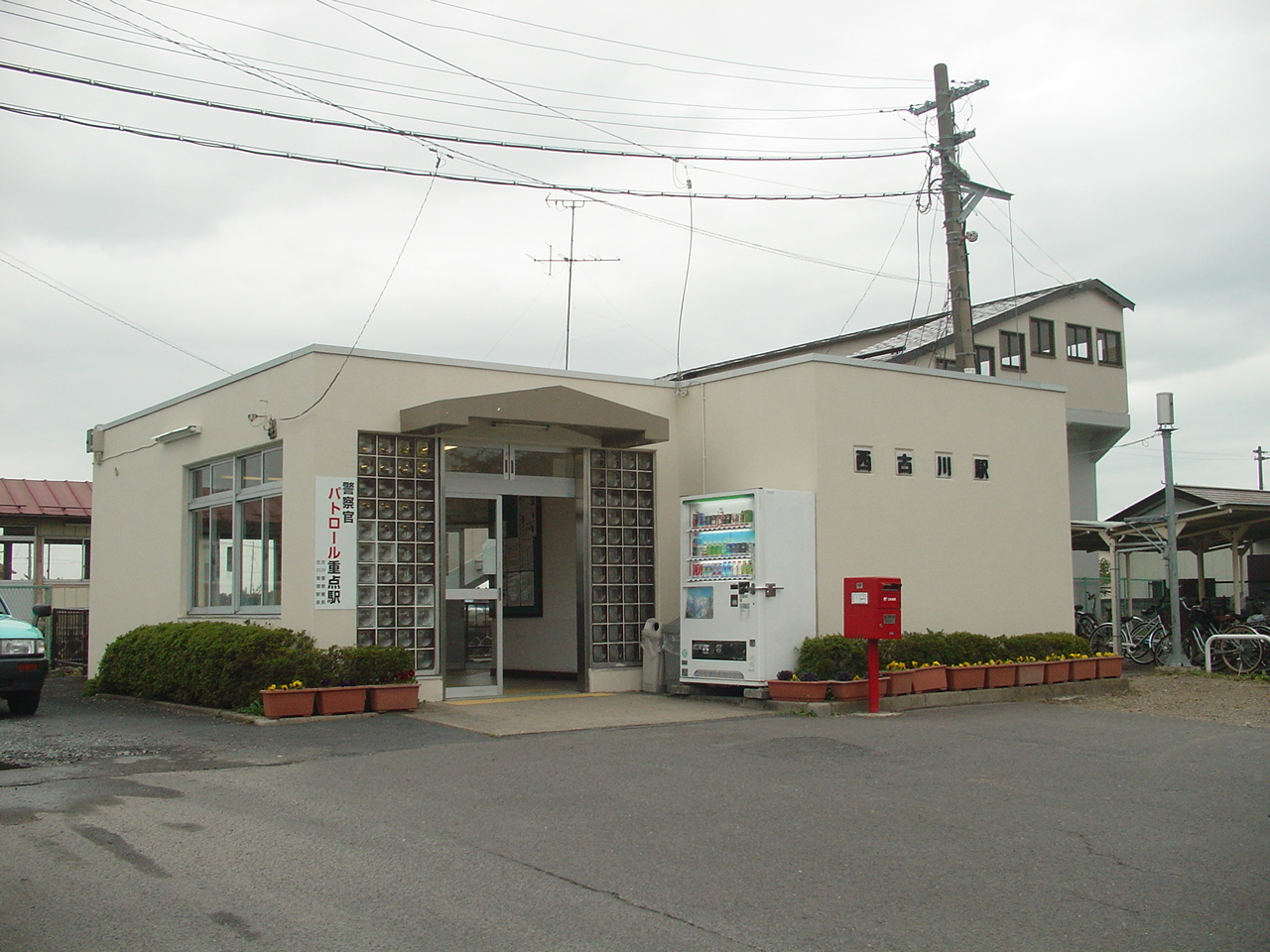
- Nishi-Furukawa Station

General information
- Location: 1, Furukawa Niibori Aza Asahimachi, Ōsaki-shi, Miyagi-ken 989-6214; Japan
- Coordinates: 38°34′41″N 140°53′43″E
- Operator: JR East
- Line: ■ Rikuu East Line
- Distance: 15.9 km from Kogota
- Platforms: 1 island platform
- Tracks: 2

Construction
- Structure type: At grade

Other information
- Status: Unstaffed
- Website: Official website

History
- Opened: 20 April 1913
- Former names: Naka-Nitta (until 1957)

Passengers
- FY 2010: 503 daily

Services
Preceding station	JR East	Following station
Higashi-Ōsaki towards Shinjō	Rikuu East Line	Tsukanome towards Kogota
Location
- Location within Japan

Nishi-Furukawa Station (西古川駅, Nishi-Furukawa-eki) is a railway station on the Rikuu East Line in the city of Ōsaki, Miyagi Prefecture, Japan, operated by East Japan Railway Company (JR East).

== Lines ==
Nishi-Furukawa Station is served by the Rikuu East Line, and is located 15.9 rail kilometers from the terminus of the line at Kogota Station.

== Station layout ==
Nishi-Furukawa Station has one island platform, connected to the station building by a footbridge. The station is unattended.

=== Platforms ===
1	■ Rikuu East Line	for Mogami and Shinjō
2	■ Rikuu East Line	for Furukawa and Kogota

== History ==
Nishi-Furukawa Station opened on 20 April 1913 as Naka-Nitta Station (中新田駅). The station name was changed to its present name on 1 April 1957. The station was absorbed into the JR East network upon the privatization of JNR on April 1, 1987.

== Surrounding area ==
- Route 347

== See also ==
- List of railway stations in Japan
