= Higashi-Nagasawa Station =

Railway station in Funagata, Yamagata Prefecture, Japan

Higashi-Nagasawa Station 東長沢駅
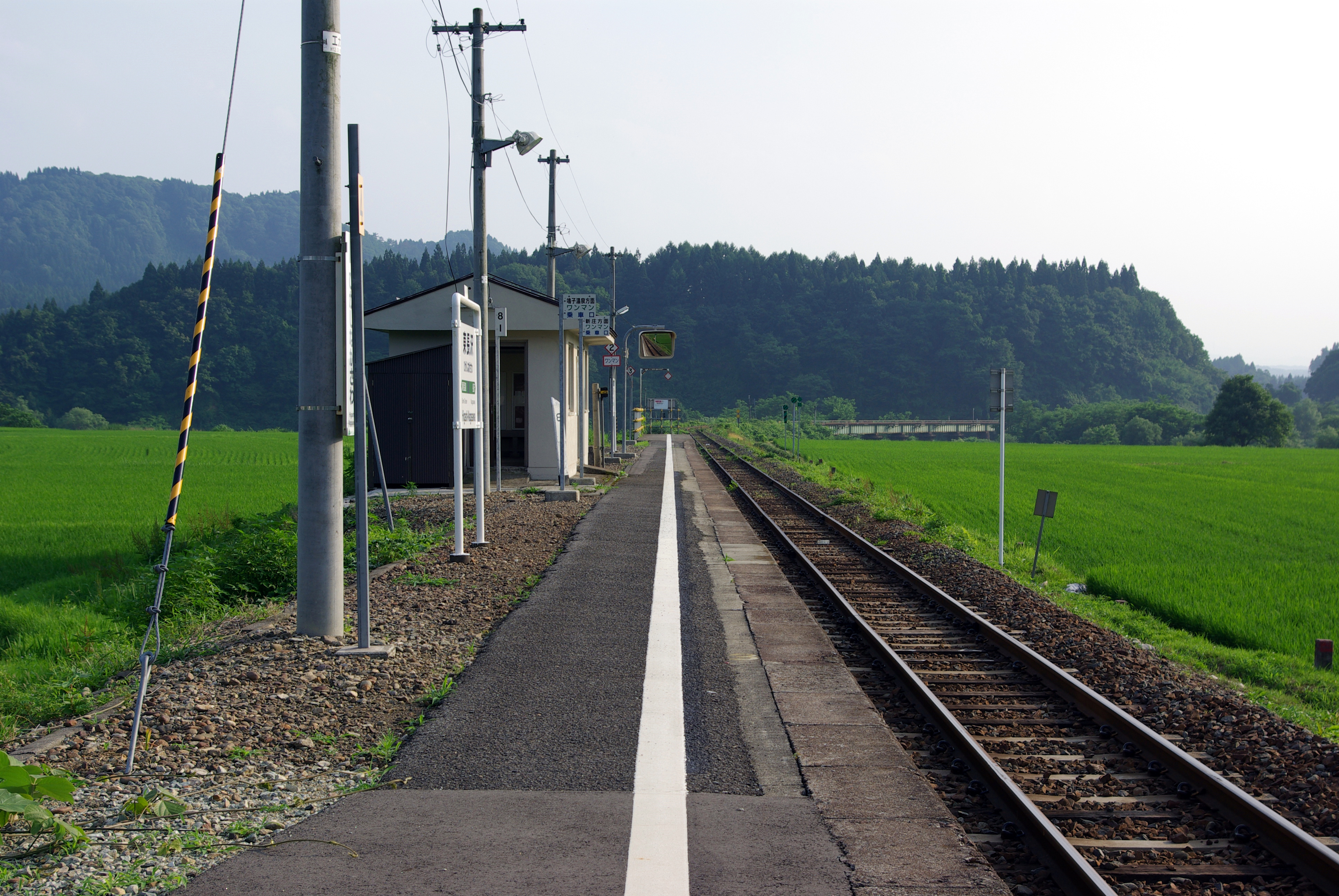
- Higashi-Nagasawa Station in July 2009

General information
- Location: Nagasawa, Funagata-machi, Mogami-gun, Yamagata-ken 999-4605; Japan
- Coordinates: 38.7188°N 140.3824°E
- Operator: JR East
- Line: ■ Rikuu East Line
- Distance: 81.0 kilometers from Kogota
- Platforms: 1 side platform

Other information
- Status: Unstaffed
- Website: Official website

History
- Opened: July 10, 1959

Passengers
- FY2004: 30

Services
| Preceding station | JR East | Following station |
|---|---|---|
| Nagasawa towards Shinjō | Rikuu East Line | Semi-Onsen towards Kogota |
Location
- Location within Yamagata Prefecture Location within Japan

Higashi-Nagasawa Station (東長沢駅, Higashi-Nagasawa-eki) is a railway station in the town of Funagata, Yamagata, Japan, operated by East Japan Railway Company (JR East).

== Lines ==
Higashi-Nagasawa Station is served by the Rikuu East Line, and is located 81.0 rail kilometers from the terminus of the line at Kogota Station.

== Station layout ==
The station has one side platform, serving a bidirectional single track. The station building is built directly on the platform. The station is unattended.

== History ==
Higashi-Nagasawa Station opened on July 10, 1959. The station was absorbed into the JR East network upon the privatization of JNR on April 1, 1987.

== Surrounding area ==
- National Route 47
- Oguni River - A tributary of the Mogami River

== See also ==
- List of railway stations in Japan
