= Ōhori Station =

Railway station in Mogami, Yamagata Prefecture, Japan

Ōhori Station 大堀駅
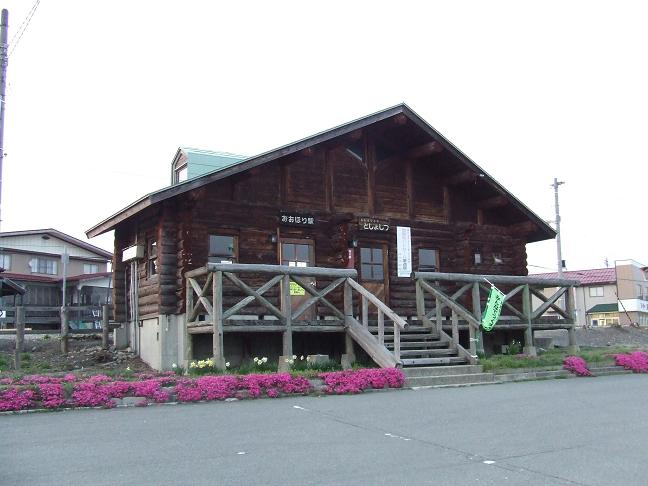
- Ōhori Station in April 2009

General information
- Location: Shimo, Mogami-machi, Mogami-gun, Yamagata-ken 999-6212; Japan
- Coordinates: 38.7657°N 140.4755°E
- Operator: JR East
- Line: ■ Rikuu East Line
- Distance: 69.5 kilometers from Kogota
- Platforms: 1 side platform

Other information
- Status: Unstaffed
- Website: Official website

History
- Opened: February 1, 1949

Passengers
- FY2004: 142

Services
Preceding station	JR East	Following station
Usugi towards Shinjō	Rikuu East Line	Mogami towards Kogota
Location
- Location within Yamagata Prefecture Location within Japan

Ōhori Station (大堀駅, Ōhori-eki) is a railway station on the Rikuu East Line in the town of Mogami, Yamagata, Japan, operated by the East Japan Railway Company (JR East).

== Lines ==
Ōhori Station is served by the Rikuu East Line, and is located 69.5 rail kilometers from the terminus of the line at Kogota Station.

== Station layout ==
The station has one side platform, serving a bidirectional single track. The station building is built in the style of a log cabin. The station is unattended.

== History ==
Ōhori Station opened on February 1, 1949. The station was absorbed into the JR East network upon the privatization of JNR on April 1, 1987.

== Surrounding area ==
- National Route 47
- Mogami Onsen
- Uzen-Ōhori Post Office

== See also ==
- List of railway stations in Japan
