= Nakayamadaira-Onsen Station =

Railway station in Ōsaki, Miyagi Prefecture, Japan

Nakayamadaira-Onsen Station 中山平温泉駅
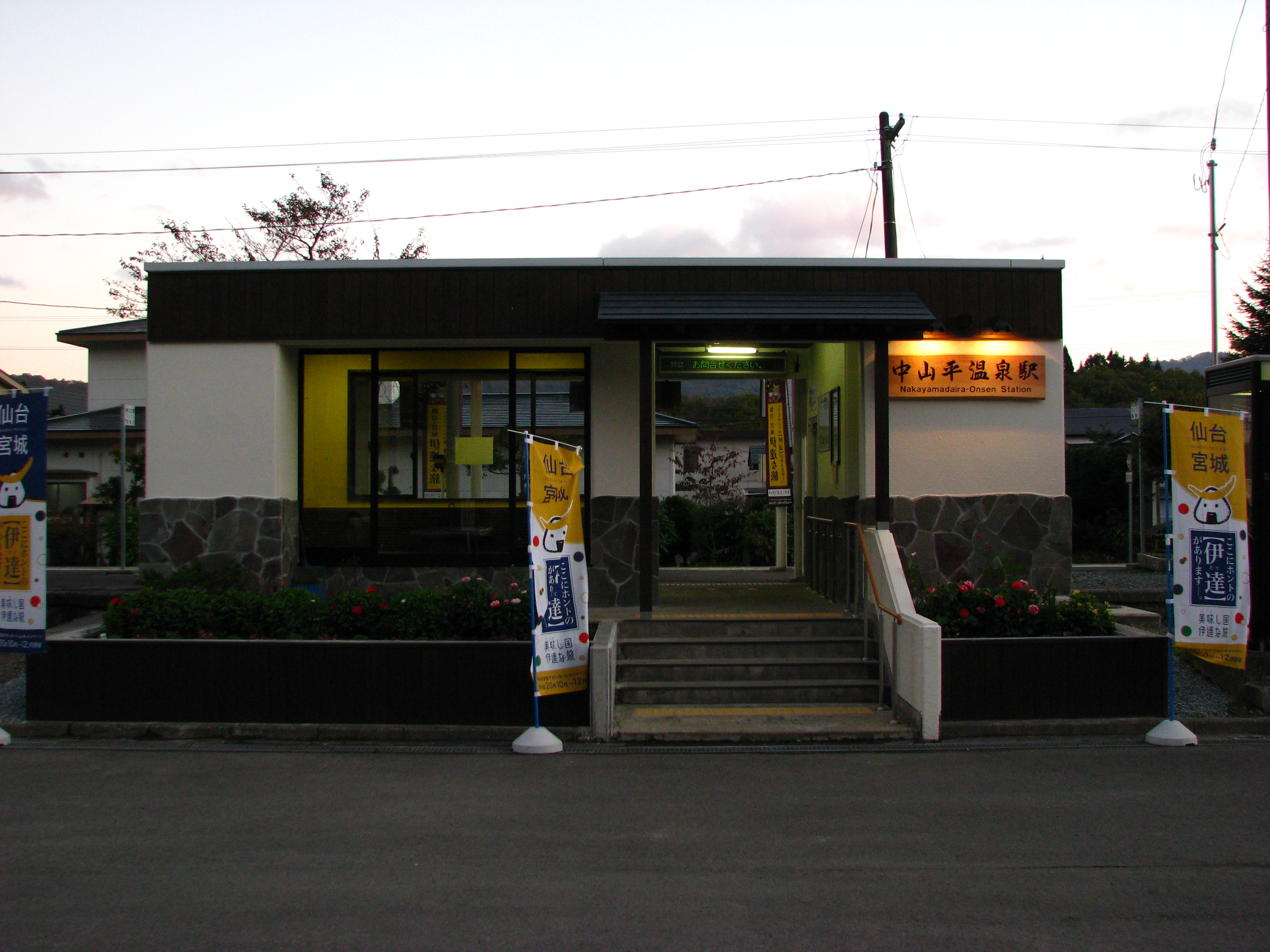
- Nakayamadaira-Onsen Station in November 2008

General information
- Location: Naruko-Onsen-aze Hoshinuma 79, Ōsaki-shi, Miyagi-ken 989-6100; Japan
- Coordinates: 38.7267°N 140.6680°E
- Operator: JR East
- Line: ■ Rikuu East Line
- Distance: 50.0 km from Kogota
- Platforms: 1 side platform
- Tracks: 1

Construction
- Structure type: At grade

Other information
- Status: Unstaffed
- Website: Official website

History
- Opened: 1 November 1917
- Former names: Nakayamadaira (to 1997)

Services
Preceding station	JR East	Following station
Sakaida towards Shinjō	Rikuu East Line	Naruko-Onsen towards Kogota
Location
- Location within Japan

Nakayamadaira-Onsen Station (中山平温泉駅, Nakayamadaira-Onsen-eki) is a railway station on the Rikuu East Line in the city of Ōsaki, Miyagi Prefecture, Japan, operated by East Japan Railway Company (JR East).

== Lines ==
Nakayamadaira-Onsen Station is served by the Rikuu East Line, and is located 50.0 kilometers from the starting point of the line at Kogota Station.

== Station layout ==
Nakayamadaira-Onsen Station has one side platform, serving a single bi-directional track. The platform was originally an island platform, but there are no longer any tracks on one side. The station is unattended.

== History ==
The station opened on 1 November 1917, named simply Nakayamadaira Station (中山平駅). The station was absorbed into the JR East network upon the privatization of JNR on 1 April 1987. The station was renamed Nakayamadaira-Onsen Station on 22 March 1997.

== Surrounding area ==
- National Route 47
- Nakayamadaira Onsen

== See also ==
- List of railway stations in Japan
