= Naruko =

Naruko may refer to:

== People with the given name ==
- Hanaharu Naruko (鳴子 ハナハル), Japanese manga artist, who often works in adult hentai manga
- Yanagiwara Naruko (柳原 愛子, (1859–1943)), Japanese lady-in-waiting of the Imperial House of Japan.

=== Fictional characters ===
- Naruko Anjo, a character in the anime Anohana

== Places ==
- Naruko Dam, is a concrete gravity-arch dam
- Naruko-Gotenyu Station, is a railway station on the Rikuu East Line
- Naruko Kita Station, is an underground metro station located in Tempaku-ku
- Naruko, Miyagi, a former town in Japan, now merged into Ōsaki, Miyagi
- Naruko-Onsen Station, is a railway station on the Rikuu East Line
- Naruko (volcano), a volcano located near the former town of Naruko in Japan

== Other uses ==
- Naruko, wooden clappers held by Yosakoi dancers in Japan
