= Usugi Station =

Railway station in Mogami, Yamagata Prefecture, Japan

Usugi Station 鵜杉駅
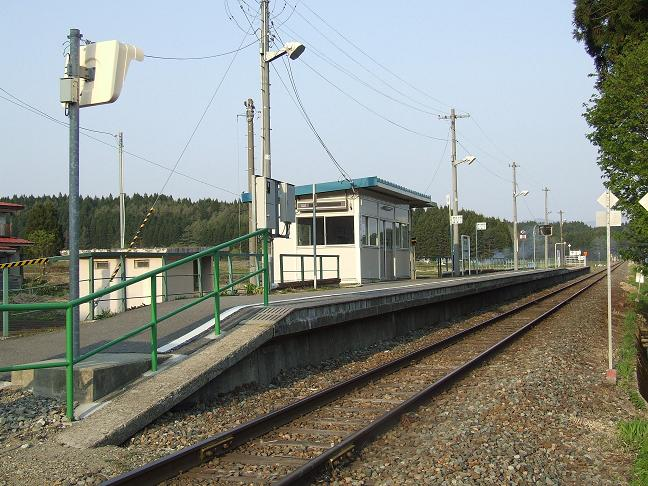
- Usugi Station in April 2009

General information
- Location: Shimo, Mogami-machi, Mogami-gun, Yamagata-ken 999-6212; Japan
- Coordinates: 38°45′53.87″N 140°27′12.58″E
- Operator: JR East
- Line: ■ Rikuu East Line
- Distance: 71.5 kilometers from Kogota
- Platforms: 1 side platform

Other information
- Status: Unstaffed
- Website: Official website

History
- Opened: September 1, 1965

Passengers
- FY2004: 51

Services
Preceding station	JR East	Following station
Semi-Onsen towards Shinjō	Rikuu East Line	Ōhori towards Kogota
Location
- Location within Yamagata Prefecture Location within Japan

Usugi Station (鵜杉駅, Usugi-eki) is a railway station in the town of Mogami, Yamagata, Japan, operated by East Japan Railway Company (JR East).

== Lines ==
Usugi Station is served by the Rikuu East Line, and is located 71.5 rail kilometers from the terminus of the line at Kogota Station.

== Station layout ==
The station has one side platform, serving a bidirectional single track. The station building is built directly on the platform. The station is unattended.

== History ==
Usugi Station opened on September 1, 1965. The station was absorbed into the JR East network upon the privatization of JNR on April 1, 1987.

== Surrounding area ==
- National Route 47
- Oguni River - A tributary of the Mogami River

== See also ==
- List of railway stations in Japan
