= Nishi-Ōsaki Station =

Railway station in Ōsaki, Miyagi Prefecture, Japan

Nishi-Ōsaki Station 西大崎駅
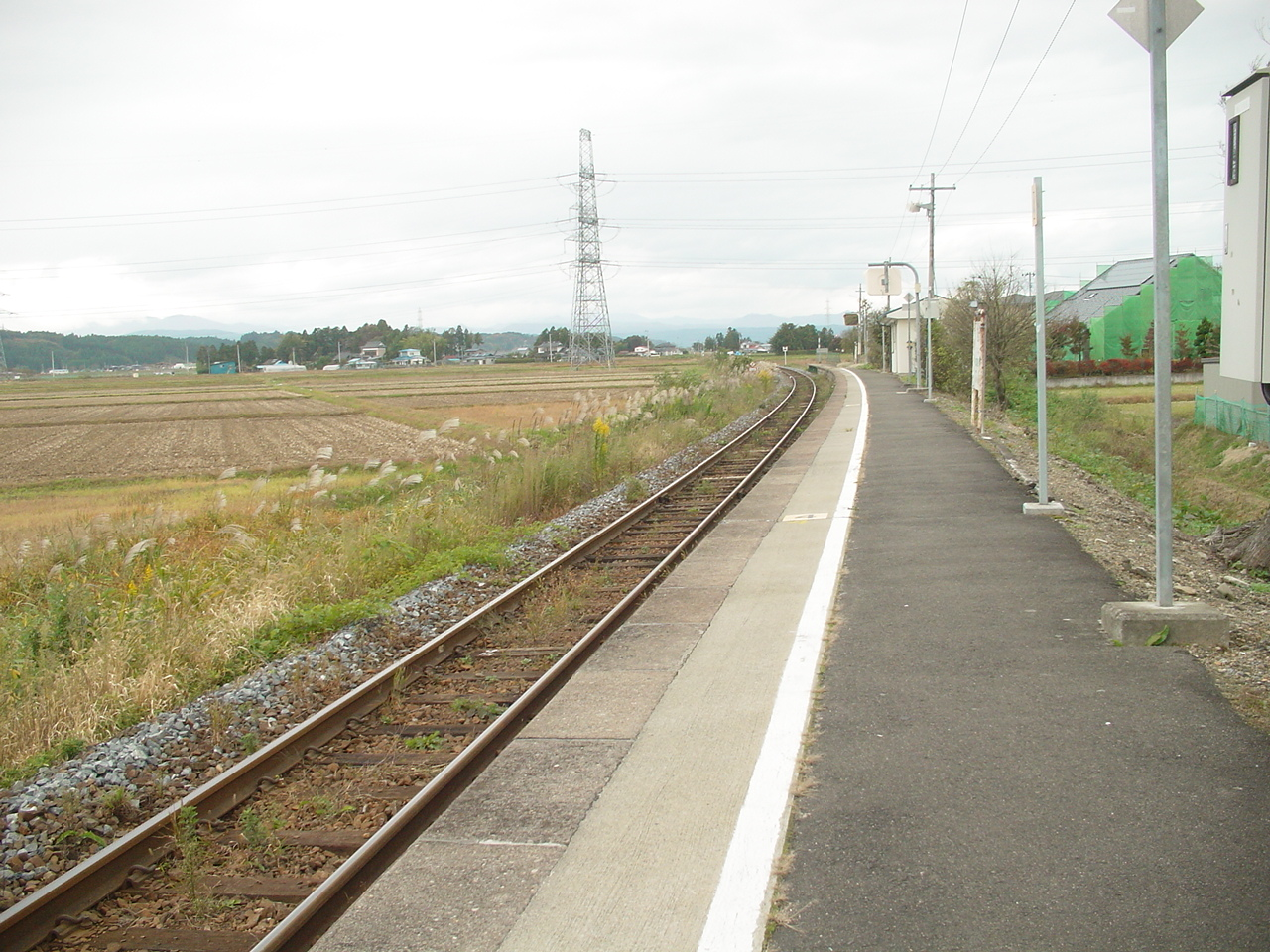
- Nishi-Ōsaki Station in October 2007

General information
- Location: Iwadeyama-Shimonome aze Koizumi 119, Ōsaki-shi, Miyagi-ken 989-6412; Japan
- Coordinates: 38.6301°N 140.8894°E
- Operator: JR East
- Line: ■ Rikuu East Line
- Distance: 21.9 km from Kogota
- Platforms: 1 side platform
- Tracks: 1

Construction
- Structure type: At grade

Other information
- Status: Unstaffed
- Website: Official website

History
- Opened: 1 November 1917
- Former names: Kami-Iwadeyama (until 1997)

Services
Preceding station	JR East	Following station
Iwadeyama towards Shinjō	Rikuu East Line	Higashi-Ōsaki towards Kogota
Location
- Location within Japan

Nishi-Ōsaki Station (西大崎駅, Nishi-Ōsaki-eki) is a railway station on the Rikuu East Line in the city of Ōsaki, Miyagi Prefecture, Japan, operated by East Japan Railway Company (JR East).

== Lines ==
Nishi-Ōsaki Station is served by the Rikuu East Line, and is located 21.9 rail kilometers from the terminus of the line at Kogota Station.

== Station layout ==
Nishi-Ōsaki Station has one side platform, serving a single bi-directional track. There is no station building. The station is unattended.

== History ==
Nishi-Ōsaki Station opened on 20 April 1960 as Kami-Iwadeyama Station (上岩出山駅, Kami-Iwadeyama eki). The station was absorbed into the JR East network upon the privatization of JNR on 1 April 1987. The station was renamed to its present name on 22 March 1997.

== Surrounding area ==
- Japan National Route 47

== See also ==
- List of railway stations in Japan
