= Akakura-Onsen Station =

Railway station in Mogami, Yamagata Prefecture, Japan

Akakura-Onsen Station 赤倉温泉駅
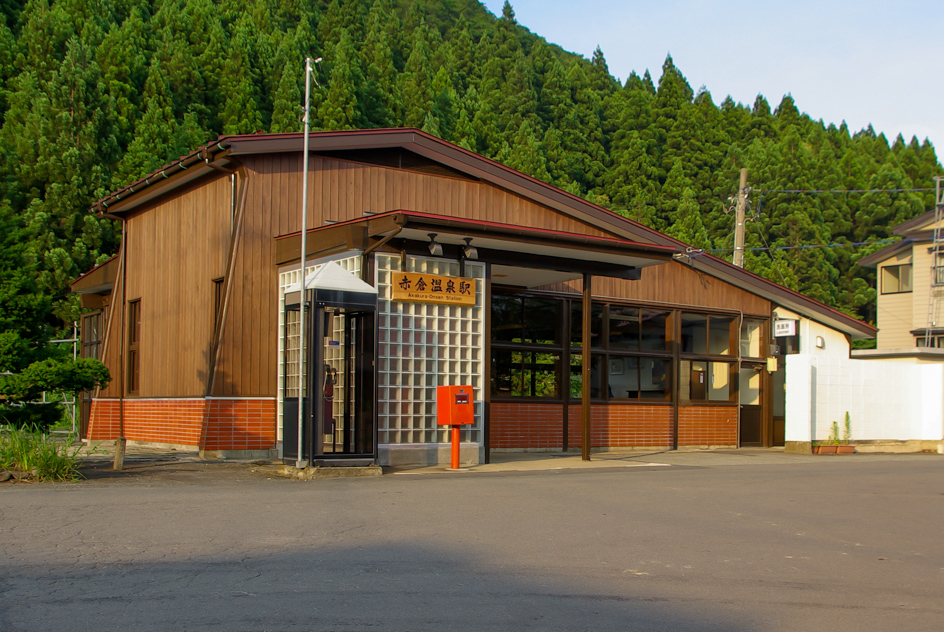
- Akakura Onsen Station in July 2009

General information
- Location: 1341 Tomisawa, Mogami-machi, Mogami-gun, Yamagata-ken 999-6105; Japan
- Coordinates: 38.7306°N 140.5539°E
- Operator: JR East
- Line: ■ Rikuu East Line
- Distance: 61.1 kilometers from Kogota
- Platforms: 1 side platform

Other information
- Status: Unstaffed
- Website: Official website

History
- Opened: November 1, 1917
- Former names: Uzen-Akakura; Tomisawa (until 1999)

Passengers
- FY2004: 47

Services
Preceding station	JR East	Following station
Tachikōji towards Shinjō	Rikuu East Line	Sakaida towards Kogota
Location
- Location within Yamagata Prefecture Location within Japan

Akakura-Onsen Station (赤倉温泉駅, Akakura-Onsen-eki) is a railway station in the town of Mogami, Yamagata, Japan, operated by East Japan Railway Company (JR East).

== Lines ==
Akakura-Onsen Station is served by the Rikuu East Line, and is located 61.6 rail kilometers from the terminus of the line at Kogota Station.

== Station layout ==
Akakura-Onsen Station has one side platform, serving a single bidirectional track. The platform was originally an island platform, but there are no longer any tracks on one side. The station is unattended.

== History ==
Akakura-Onsen Station opened on November 1, 1917, as Tomisawa Station (富沢駅, Tomisawa-eki). It was renamed Uzen-Akakura Station (羽前赤倉, Uzen-Akakura eki) on November 15, 1954. The station was absorbed into the JR East network upon the privatization of JNR on April 1, 1987. It was renamed to its present name on December 4, 1999.

== Surrounding area ==
- National Route 47
- Akakura Onsen
- Uzen-Akakura Post Office

== See also ==
- List of railway stations in Japan
