= Sakaida Station =

Railway station in Mogami, Yamagata Prefecture, Japan

Sakaida Station 堺田駅
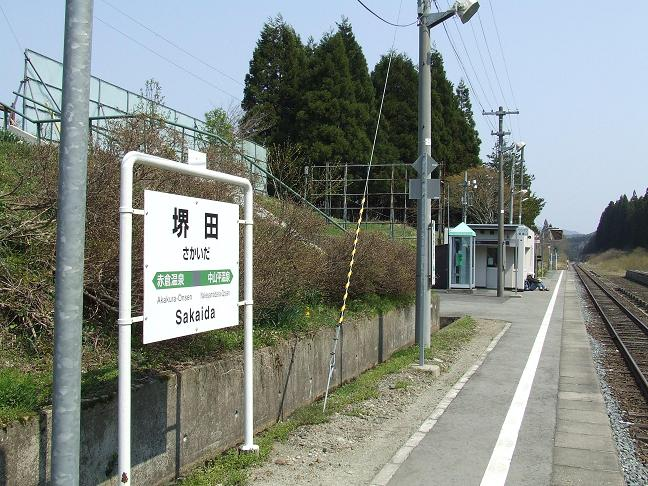
- Sakaida Station in April 2009

General information
- Location: Sakaida, Mogami-machi, Mogami-gun, Yamagata-ken 999-6106; Japan
- Coordinates: 38.7356°N 140.6129°E
- Operator: JR East
- Line: ■ Rikuu East Line
- Distance: 55.3 kilometers from Kogota
- Platforms: 1 side platform

Other information
- Status: Unstaffed
- Website: Official website

History
- Opened: November 1, 1917

Passengers
- FY2004: 5

Services
Preceding station	JR East	Following station
Akakura-Onsen towards Shinjō	Rikuu East Line	Nakayamadaira-Onsen towards Kogota
Location
- Location within Yamagata Prefecture Location within Japan

Sakaida Station (堺田駅, Sakaida-eki) is a railway station in the town of Mogami, Yamagata, Japan, operated by East Japan Railway Company (JR East).

== Lines ==
Sakaida Station is served by the Rikuu East Line, and is located 55.3 rail kilometers from the terminus of the line at Kogota Station.

== Station layout ==
The station has one platform, serving a bidirectional single track. The platform was originally an island platform, but there are no longer any tracks on one side. The station is unattended.

== History ==
Sakaida Station opened on November 1, 1917. The station was absorbed into the JR East network upon the privatization of JNR on April 1, 1987.

== Surrounding area ==
- National Route 47

== See also ==
- List of railway stations in Japan
