= Tachikōji Station =

Railway station in Mogami, Yamagata Prefecture, Japan

Tachikōji Station 立小路駅
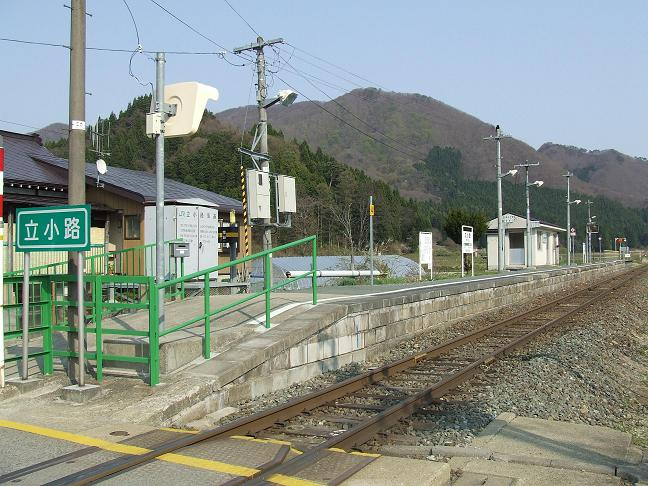
- Tachikōji Station in April 2009

General information
- Location: Tomizawa, Mogami-machi, Mogami-gun, Yamagata-ken 999-6105; Japan
- Coordinates: 38.7420°N 140.5427°E
- Operator: JR East
- Line: ■ Rikuu East Line
- Distance: 62.8 kilometers from Kogota
- Platforms: 1 side platform

Other information
- Status: Unstaffed
- Website: Official website

History
- Opened: July 10, 1959

Passengers
- FY2004: 9

Services
Preceding station	JR East	Following station
Mogami towards Shinjō	Rikuu East Line	Akakura-Onsen towards Kogota
Location
- Location within Yamagata Prefecture Location within Japan

Tachikōji Station (立小路駅, Tachikōji-eki) is a railway station in the town of Mogami, Yamagata, Japan, operated by East Japan Railway Company (JR East).

== Lines ==
Tachikōji Station is served by the Rikuu East Line, and is located 62.8 rail kilometers from the terminus of the line at Kogota Station.

== Station layout ==
The station has one side platform, serving a single bidirectional track. The station building is built directly on the platform. The station is unattended.

== History ==
Tachikōji Station opened on July 10, 1959. The station was absorbed into the JR East network upon the privatization of JNR on April 1, 1987.

== Surrounding area ==
- National Route 47

== See also ==
- List of railway stations in Japan
