= Kaminome Station =

Railway station in Ōsaki, Miyagi Prefecture, Japan

Kaminome Station 上野目駅
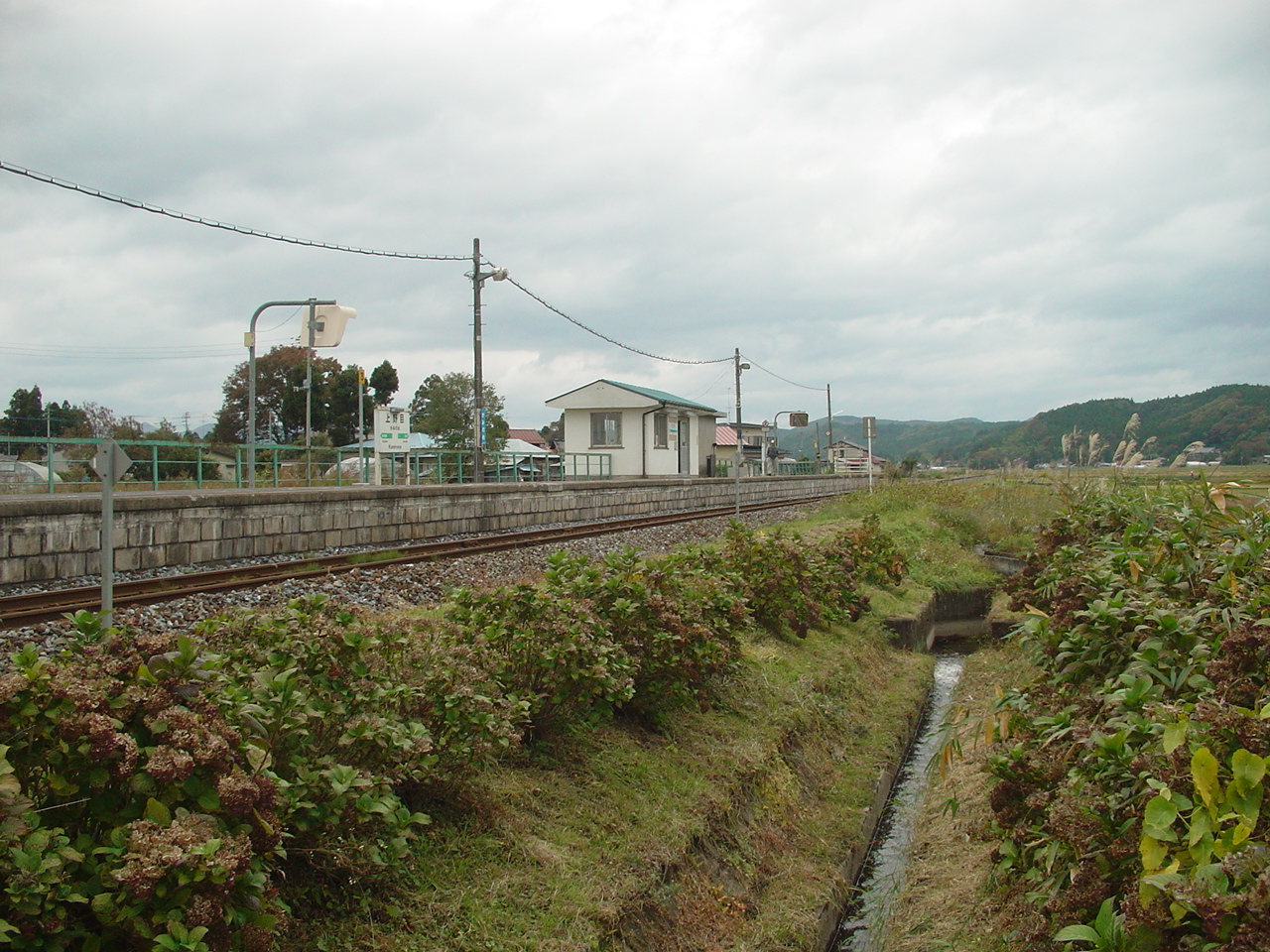
- Kaminome Station in October 2007

General information
- Location: Iwadeyama-Shimoichikuri-aze Kumanodo 46, Ōsaki-shi, Miyagi-ken 89-6404; Japan
- Coordinates: 38.6803°N 140.8595°E
- Operator: JR East
- Line: ■ Rikuu East Line
- Distance: 28.6 km from Kogota
- Platforms: 1 side platform
- Tracks: 1

Construction
- Structure type: At grade

Other information
- Status: Unstaffed
- Website: Official website

History
- Opened: 1 February 1964
- Former names: Nishi-Iwadeyama (until 1997)

Services
Preceding station	JR East	Following station
Ikezuki towards Shinjō	Rikuu East Line	Yūbikan towards Kogota
Location
- Location within Japan

Kaminome Station (上野目駅, Kaminome-eki) is a railway station on the Rikuu East Line in the city of Ōsaki, Miyagi Prefecture, Japan, operated by East Japan Railway Company (JR East).

== Lines ==
Kaminome Station is served by the Rikuu East Line, and is located 28.6 rail kilometers from the terminus of the line at Kogota Station.

== Station layout ==
Kaminome Station has one side platform, serving a single bi-directional track. The station is unattended.

== History ==
Kaminome Station opened on 1 February 1964 as Nishi-Iwadeyama Station (西岩出山駅). The station was absorbed into the JR East network upon the privatization of JNR on April 1, 1987. The station was renamed to its present name on 22 March 1997.

== Surrounding area ==
- Japan National Route 47

== See also ==
- List of railway stations in Japan
