= Higashi-Ōsaki Station =

Railway station in Ōsaki, Miyagi Prefecture, Japan

Higashi-Ōsaki Station 東大崎駅
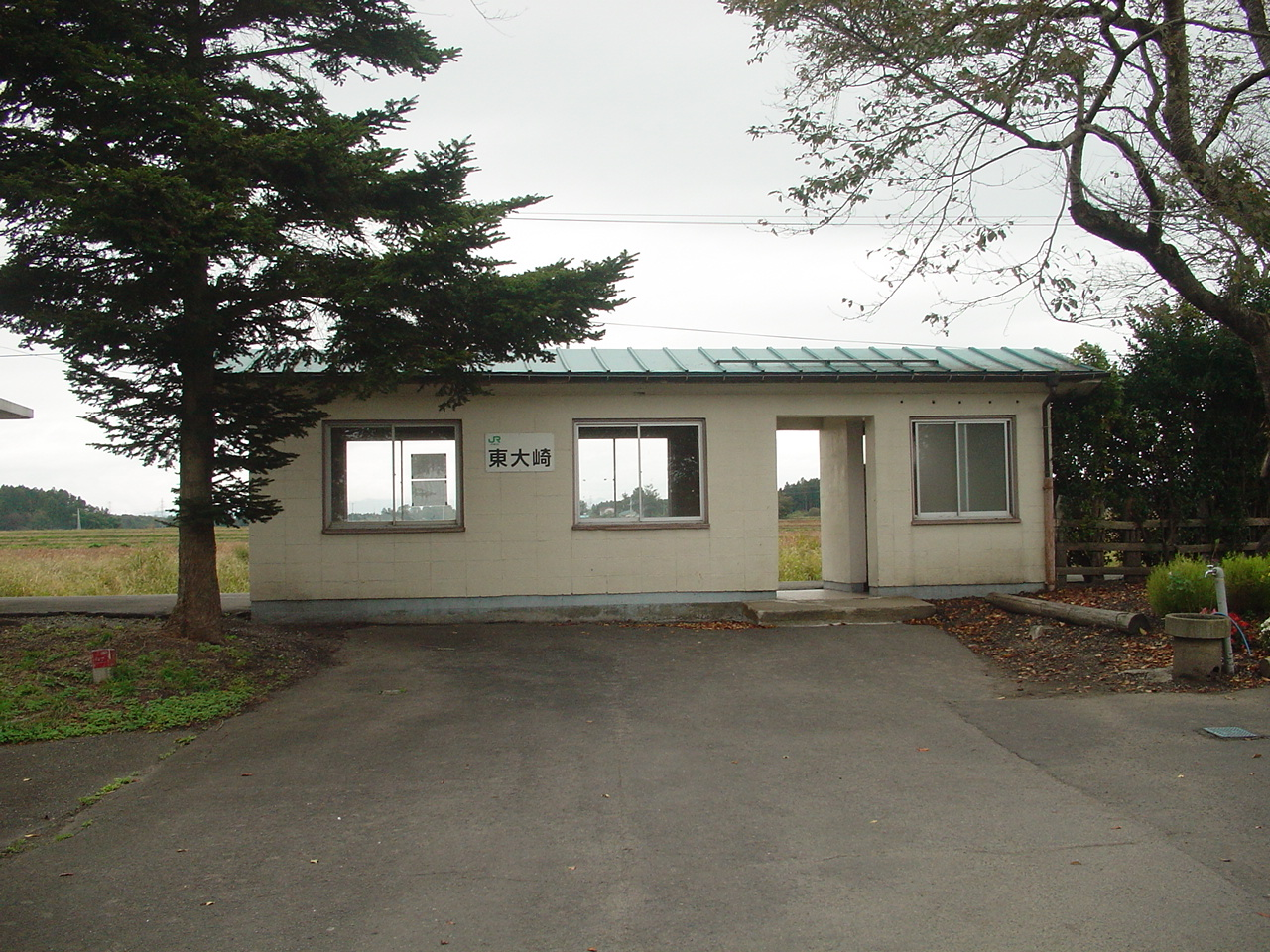
- Higashi-Ōsaki Station in October 2007

General information
- Location: Furukawa-Ōsaki, Ōsaki-shi, Miyagi-ken 989-6227; Japan
- Coordinates: 38.6055°N 140.8969°E
- Operator: JR East
- Line: ■ Rikuu East Line
- Distance: 19.1 km from Kogota
- Platforms: 1 side platform
- Tracks: 1

Construction
- Structure type: At grade

Other information
- Status: Unstaffed
- Website: Official website

History
- Opened: 15 February 1955

Services
Preceding station	JR East	Following station
Nishi-Ōsaki towards Shinjō	Rikuu East Line	Nishi-Furukawa towards Kogota
Location
- Location within Japan

Higashi-Ōsaki Station (東大崎駅, Higashi-Ōsaki-eki) is a railway station on the Rikuu East Line in the city of Ōsaki, Miyagi Prefecture, Japan, operated by East Japan Railway Company (JR East).

== Lines ==
Higashi-Ōsaki Station is served by the Rikuu East Line, and is located 19.1 rail kilometers from the terminus of the line at Kogota Station.

== Station layout ==
Higashi-Ōsaki Station has one side platform, serving a single bi-directional track. The station is unattended.

== History ==
Higashi-Ōsaki Station opened on 15 February 1955. The station was absorbed into the JR East network upon the privatization of JNR on 1 April 1987.

== Surrounding area ==
- former Furukawa town hall

== See also ==
- List of railway stations in Japan
