= Minami-Shinjō Station =

Railway station in Shinjō, Yamagata Prefecture, Japan

Minami-Shinjō Station 南新庄駅
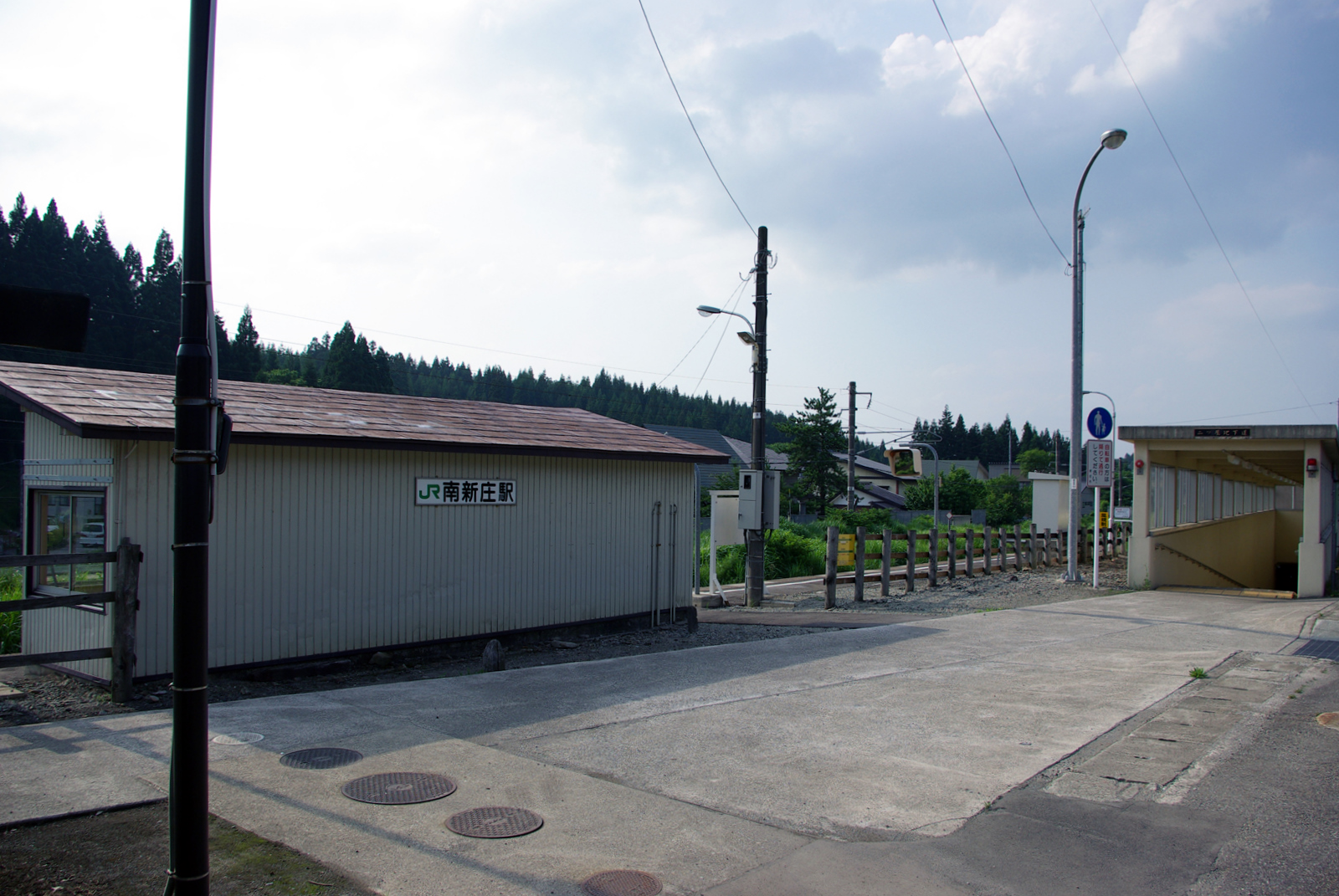
- Minami-Shinjō Station in July 2009

General information
- Location: Torigoe, Shinjō-shi, Yamagata-ken 996-0041; Japan
- Coordinates: 38°43′18″N 140°18′58″E
- Operator: JR East
- Line: ■ Rikuu East Line
- Distance: 89.2 kilometers from Kogota
- Platforms: 1 side platform

Other information
- Status: Unstaffed
- Website: Official website

History
- Opened: December 20, 1960

Passengers
- FY2004: 2

Services
Preceding station	JR East	Following station
Shinjō Terminus	Rikuu East Line	Nagasawa towards Kogota
Location
- Location within Yamagata Prefecture Location within Japan

Minami-Shinjō Station (南新庄駅, Minami-Shinjō-eki) is a railway station on the Rikuu East Line in the city of Shinjō, Yamagata, Japan, operated by East Japan Railway Company (JR East).

== Lines ==
Minami-Shinjō Station is served by the Rikuu East Line, and is located 89.2 rail kilometers from the terminus of the line at Kogota Station.

== Station layout ==
The station has one side platform, serving a single bi-directional track. The station is unattended. The track for the Ōu Main Line (Yamagata Shinkansen) runs through the station without a platform.

== History ==
Minami-Shinjō Station opened on December 20, 1960. The station was absorbed into the JR East network upon the privatization of JNR on April 1, 1987.

== Surrounding area ==
- National Route 13

== See also ==
- List of railway stations in Japan
