= Tsukanome Station =

Railway station in Ōsaki, Miyagi Prefecture, Japan

Tsukanome Station 塚目駅
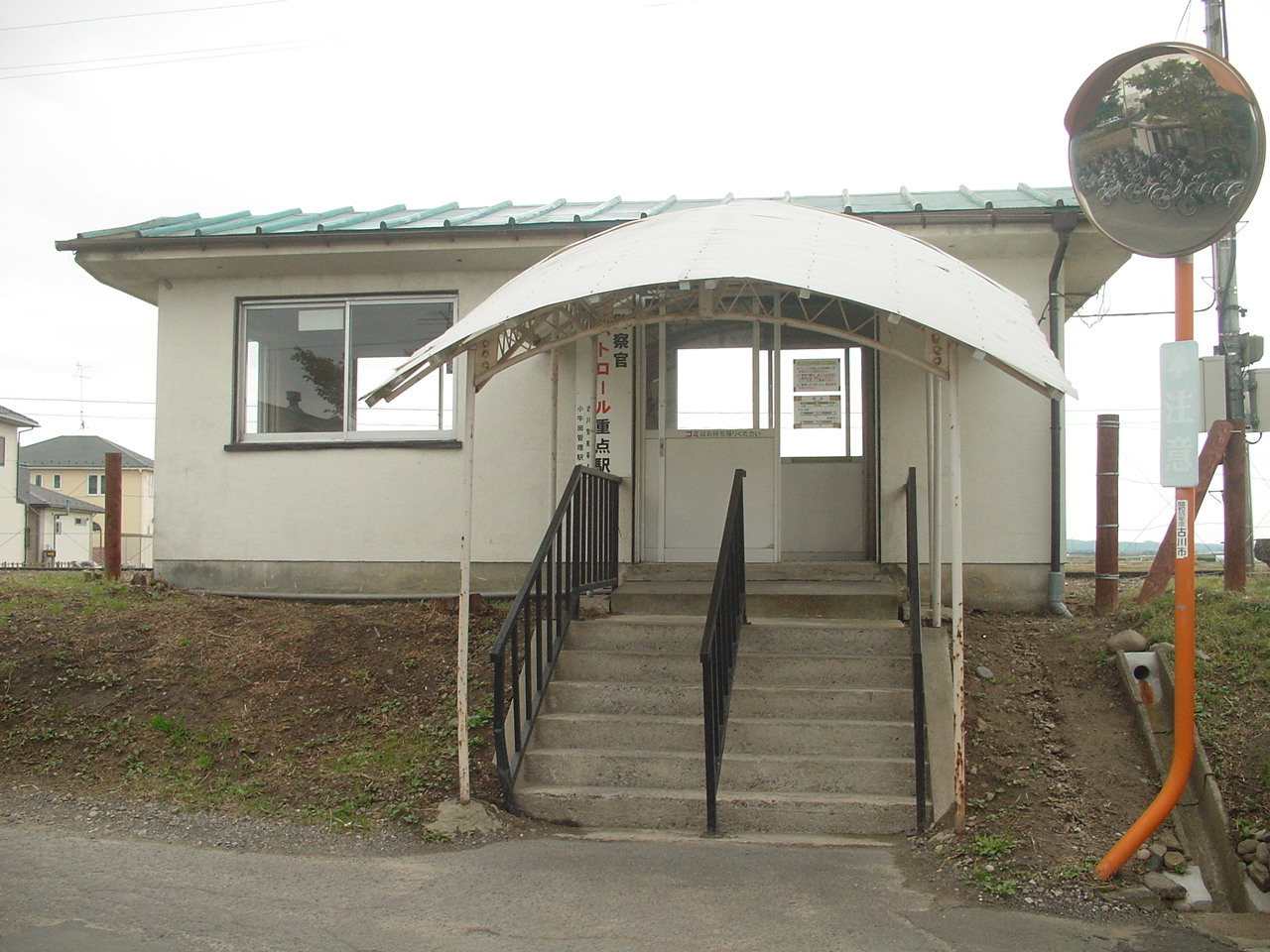
- Tsukanome Station in October 2007

General information
- Location: Furukawa-Tsukanome aze Kanezara 232, Ōsaki-shi, Miyagi-ken 989-6225; Japan
- Coordinates: 38.5723°N 140.9373°E
- Operator: JR East
- Line: ■ Rikuu East Line
- Distance: 12.1 km from Kogota
- Platforms: 1 side platform
- Tracks: 1

Construction
- Structure type: At grade

Other information
- Status: Unstaffed
- Website: Official website

History
- Opened: 1 May 1960

Services
Preceding station	JR East	Following station
Nishi-Furukawa towards Shinjō	Rikuu East Line	Furukawa towards Kogota
Location
- Location within Japan

Tsukanome Station (塚目駅, Tsukanome-eki) is a railway station on the Rikuu East Line in the city of Ōsaki, Miyagi Prefecture, Japan, operated by East Japan Railway Company (JR East).

== Lines ==
Tsukanome Station is served by the Rikuu East Line, and is located 12.1 rail kilometers from the terminus of the line at Kogota Station.

== Station layout ==
Tsukanome Station has one side platform, serving a single bi-directional track. The station is unattended.

== History ==
Tsukanome Station opened on 1 May 1960. The station was absorbed into the JR East network upon the privatization of JNR on 1 April 1987.

== Surrounding area ==
- Japan National Route 347

== See also ==
- List of railway stations in Japan
