= Naruko-Gotenyu Station =

Railway station in Ōsaki, Miyagi Prefecture, Japan

Naruko-Gotenyu Station 鳴子御殿湯駅
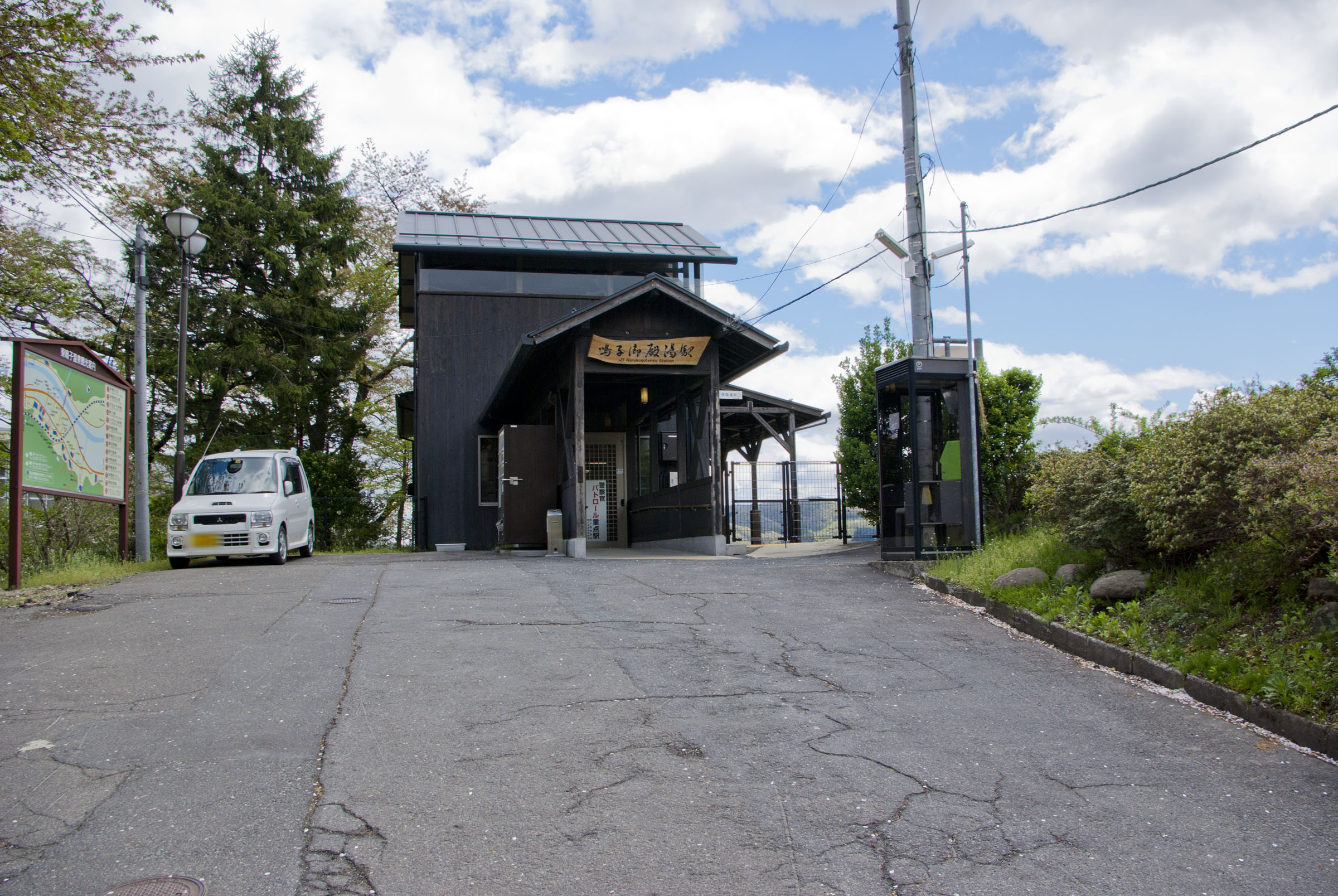
- Naruko-Gotenyu Station in May 2010

General information
- Location: Naruko-Onsen-aze Washinosu 90, Ōsaki-shi, Miyagi-ken 989-6100; Japan
- Coordinates: 38.7445°N 140.7373°E
- Operator: JR East
- Line: ■ Rikuu East Line
- Distance: 42.7 km from Kogota
- Platforms: 1 side platform
- Tracks: 1

Construction
- Structure type: At grade

Other information
- Status: Staffed
- Website: Official website

History
- Opened: 25 January 1952
- Former names: Higashi-Naruko (to 1997)

Passengers
- FY2016: 60 daily

Services
Preceding station	JR East	Following station
Naruko-Onsen towards Shinjō	Rikuu East Line	Kawatabi-Onsen towards Kogota
Location
- Location within Japan

Naruko-Gotenyu Station (鳴子御殿湯駅, Naruko-Goten'yu-eki) is a railway station on the Rikuu East Line in the city of Ōsaki, Miyagi Prefecture, Japan, operated by East Japan Railway Company (JR East).

== Lines ==
Naruko-Gotenyu Station is served by the Rikuu East Line, and is located 42.7 rail kilometers from the terminus of the line at Kogota Station.

== Station layout ==
Naruko-Gotenyu Station has one side platform, serving a single bi-directional track. The station is attended.

== History ==
Naruko-Gotenyu Station opened on 25 January 1952 as Higashi-Naruko Station (東鳴子駅). The station was absorbed into the JR East network upon the privatization of JNR on April 1, 1987. The station was renamed to its present name on 22 March 1997.

== Passenger statistics ==
In fiscal 2016, the station was used by an average of 60 passengers daily (boarding passengers only).

== Surrounding area ==
- Japan National Route 47
- Higashi-Naruko Onsen

== See also ==
- List of railway stations in Japan
