= Nagasawa Station =

Railway station in Funagata, Yamagata Prefecture, Japan

Nagasawa Station 長沢駅
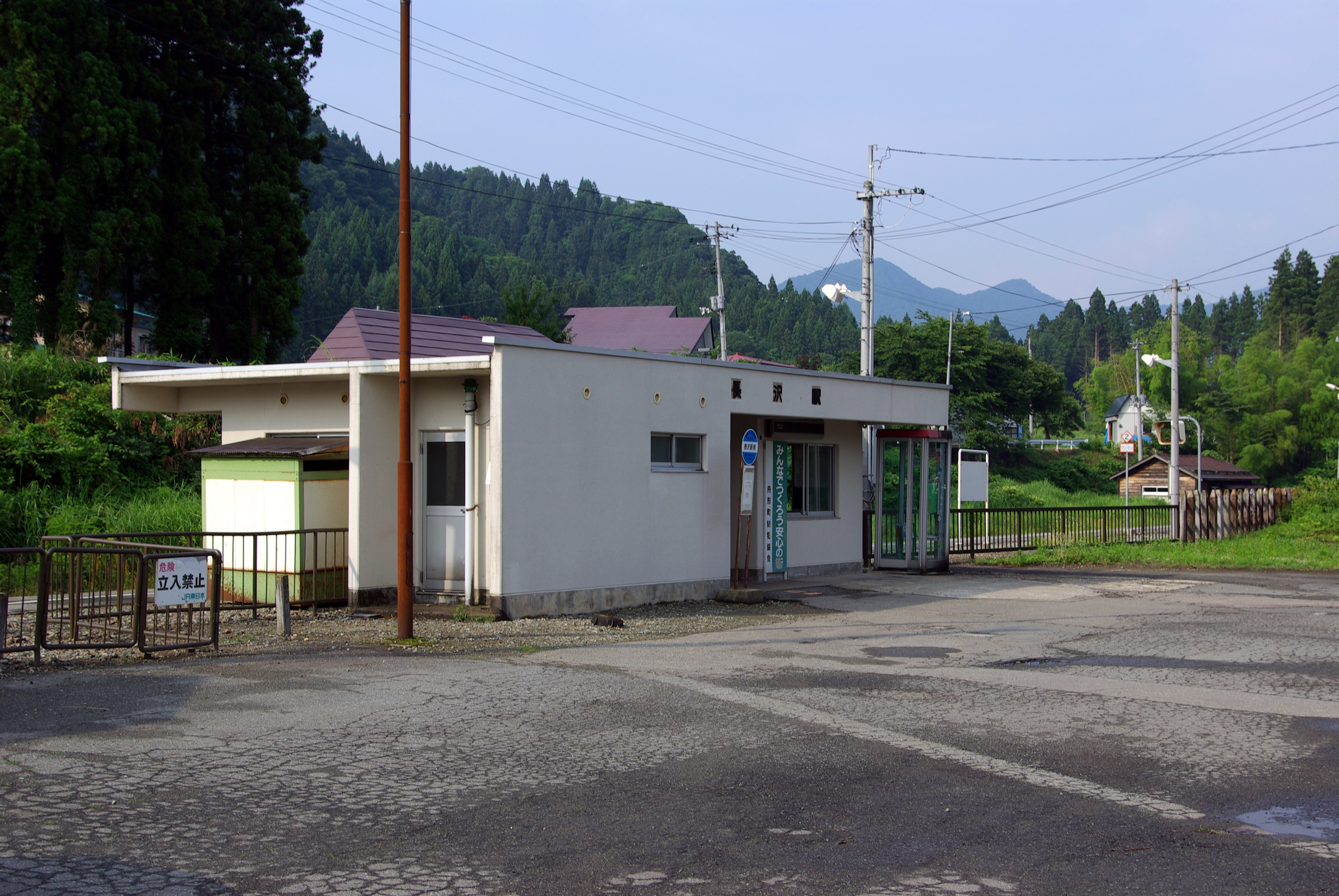
- Nagasawa Station in July 2009

General information
- Location: Nagasawa, Funagata-machi, Mogami-gun, Yamagata-ken 999-4605; Japan
- Coordinates: 38.7100°N 140.3658°E
- Operator: JR East
- Line: ■ Rikuu East Line
- Distance: 82.8 kilometers from Kogota
- Platforms: 1 side platform

Other information
- Status: Unstaffed
- Website: Official website

History
- Opened: November 1, 1915

Passengers
- FY2004: 30

Services
Preceding station	JR East	Following station
Minami-Shinjō towards Shinjō	Rikuu East Line	Higashi-Nagasawa towards Kogota
Location
- Location within Yamagata Prefecture Location within Japan

Nagasawa Station (長沢駅, Nagasawa-eki) is a railway station in the town of Funagata, Yamagata, Japan, operated by East Japan Railway Company (JR East).

== Lines ==
Nagasawa Station is served by the Rikuu East Line, and is located 82.8 rail kilometers from the terminus of the line at Kogota Station.

== Station layout ==
The station has one side platform, serving a bidirectional single track. The station is unattended.

== History ==
Nagasawa Station opened on November 1, 1915. The station was absorbed into the JR East network upon the privatization of JNR on April 1, 1987.

== Surrounding area ==
- Nagasawa Post Office

== See also ==
- List of railway stations in Japan
