= Yūbikan Station =

Railway station in Ōsaki, Miyagi Prefecture, Japan

Yūbikan Station 有備館駅
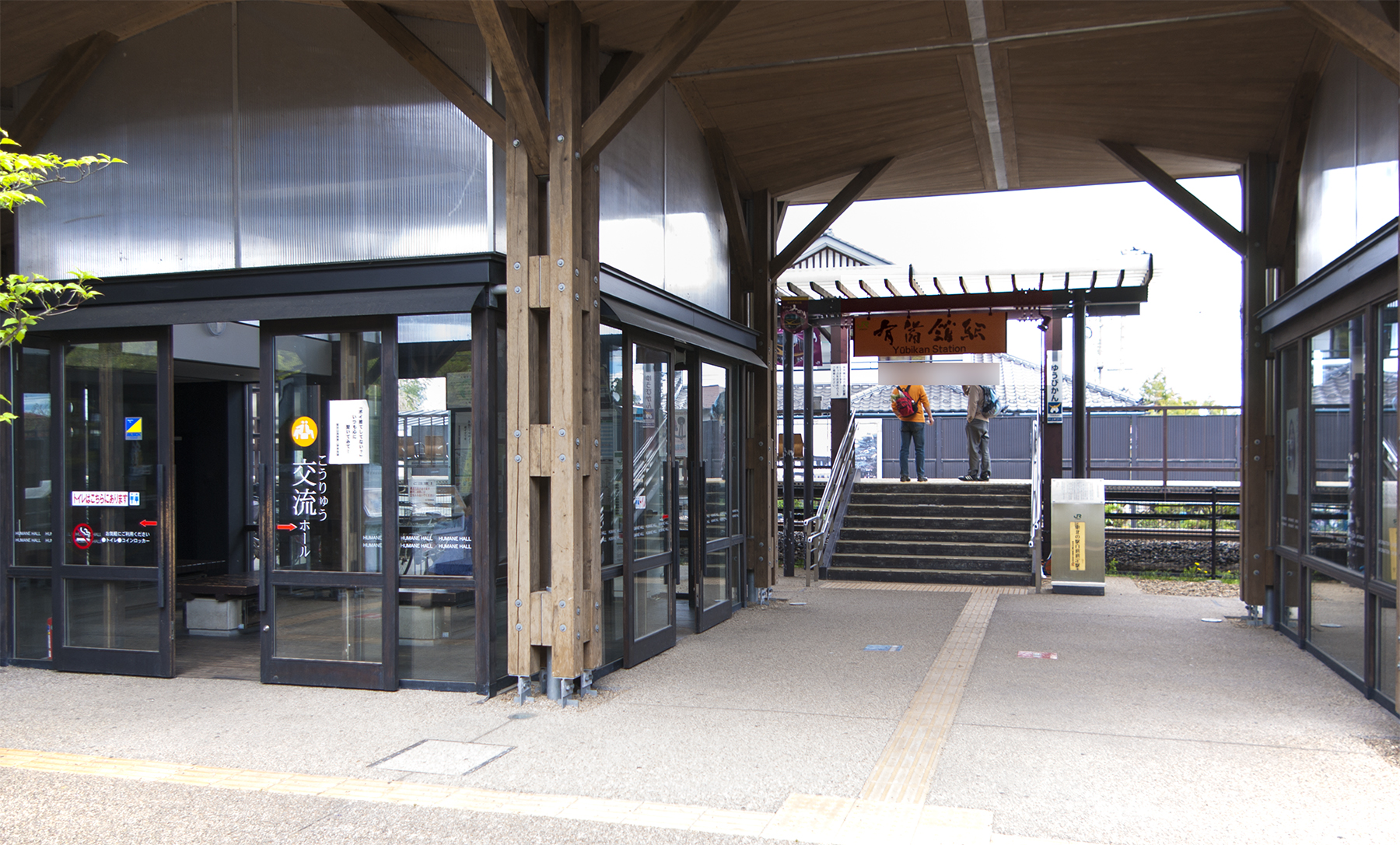
- Yūbikan Station in May 2010

General information
- Location: Iwadeyama Kami-Kawaharamachi 9-1, Ōsaki-shi, Miyagi^ken 989-6471; Japan
- Coordinates: 38.6581°N 140.8646°E
- Operator: JR East
- Line: ■ Rikuu East Line
- Distance: 25.8 km from Kogota
- Platforms: 1 side platform
- Tracks: 1

Construction
- Structure type: At grade

Other information
- Status: Unstaffed
- Website: Official website

History
- Opened: 13 February 1996

Services
Preceding station	JR East	Following station
Kaminome towards Shinjō	Rikuu East Line	Iwadeyama towards Kogota
Location
- Location within Japan

Yūbikan Station (有備館駅, Yūbikan-eki) is a railway station on the Rikuu East Line in the city of Ōsaki, Miyagi Prefecture, Japan, operated by East Japan Railway Company (JR East).

== Lines ==
Yūbikan Station is served by the Rikuu East Line, and is located 25.8 rail kilometers from the terminus of the line at Kogota Station.

== Station layout ==
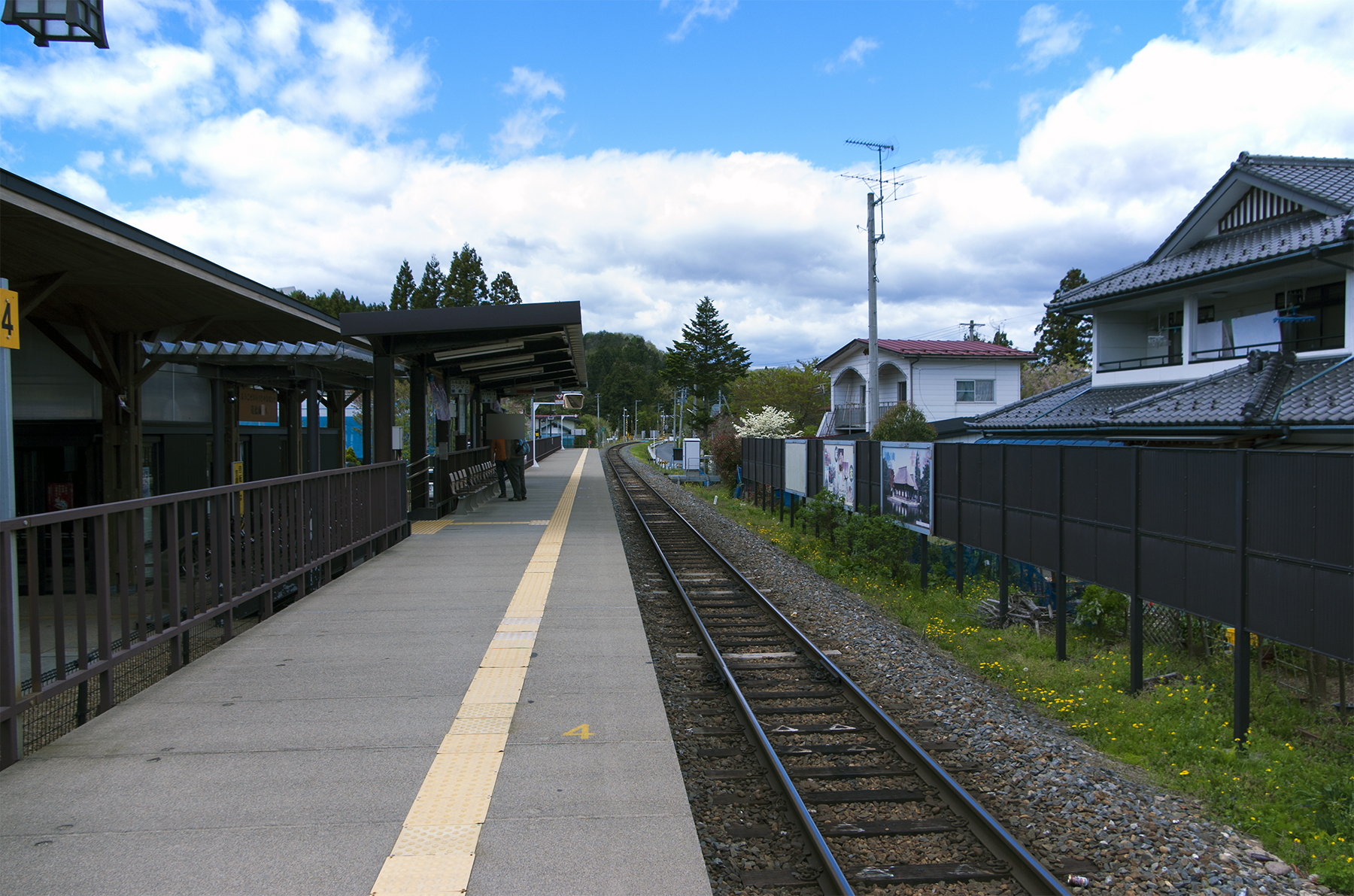
platform

Yūbikan Station has one side platform, serving a single bi-directional track. The station is unattended.

== History ==
Yūbikan Station opened on 13 February 1996.

== Surrounding area ==
- Yūbikan
- Site of Iwadeyama Castle

== See also ==
- List of railway stations in Japan
