= Naruko-Onsen Station =

Railway station in Ōsaki, Miyagi Prefecture, Japan

Naruko-Onsen Station 鳴子温泉駅
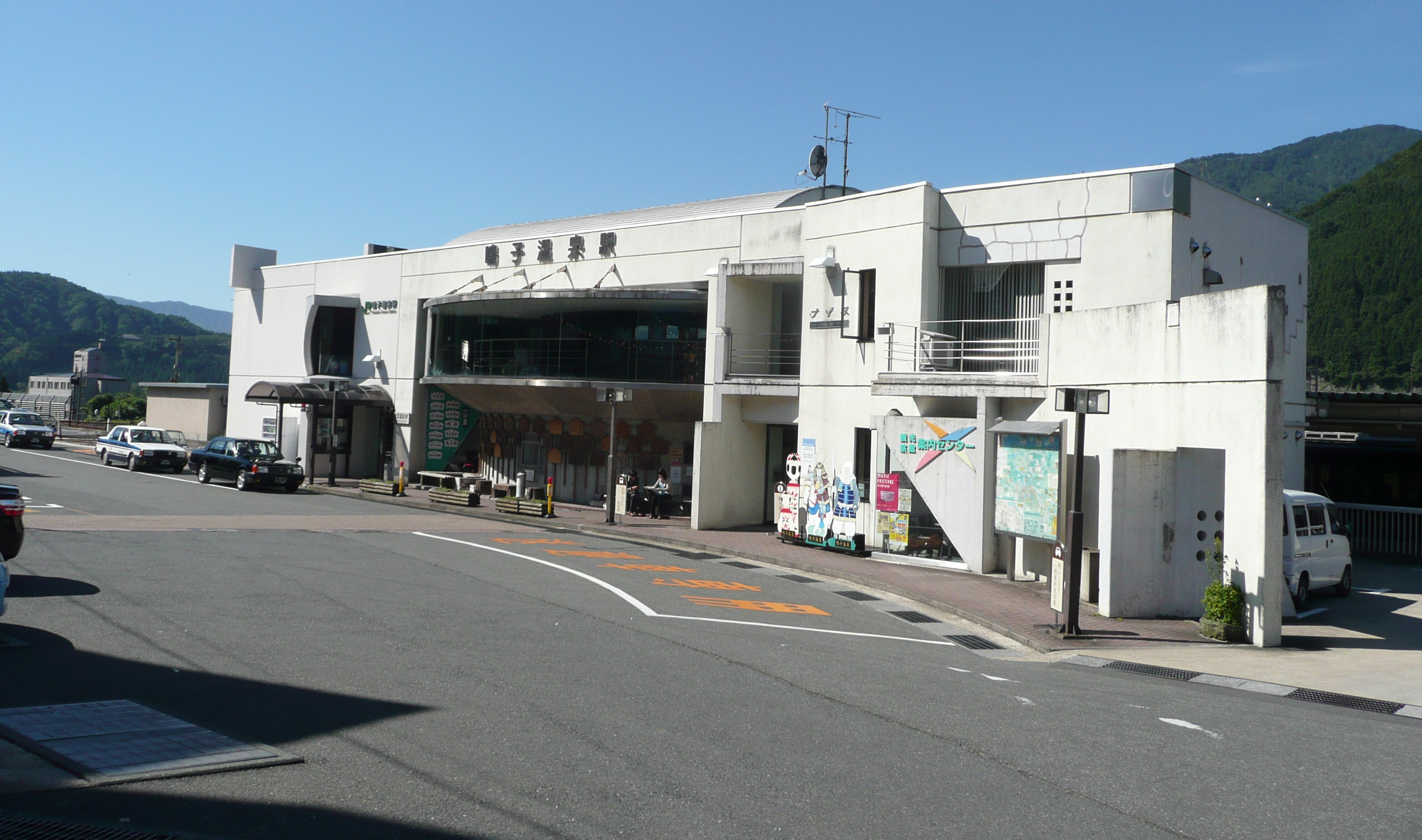
- Naruko-Onsen Station in October 2010

General information
- Location: Naruko-Onsen-aze Yumoto 2-2, Ōsaki-shi, Miyagi-ken 989-6100; Japan
- Coordinates: 38.7432°N 140.7161°E
- Operator: JR East
- Line: ■ Rikuu East Line
- Distance: 44.9 km from Kogota
- Platforms: 1 island platform
- Tracks: 2

Construction
- Structure type: At grade

Other information
- Status: Staffed (Midori no Madoguchi)
- Website: Official website

History
- Opened: 18 April 1915
- Former names: Narugo (until 1997)

Passengers
- FY2016: 226

Services
Preceding station	JR East	Following station
Nakayamadaira-Onsen towards Shinjō	Rikuu East Line	Naruko-Gotenyu towards Kogota
Location
- Location within Japan

Naruko-Onsen Station (鳴子温泉駅, Naruko-Onsen-eki) is a railway station on the Rikuu East Line in the city of Ōsaki, Miyagi Prefecture, Japan, operated by East Japan Railway Company (JR East).

== Lines ==
Naruko-Onsen Station is served by the Rikuu East Line, and is located 44.9 kilometers from the starting point of the line at Kogota Station.

== Station layout ==
Naruko-Onsen Station has one island platform, connected to the station building by a footbridge. The station has a Midori no Madoguchi staffed ticket office.

=== Platforms ===
1	■ Rikuu East Line	for Mogami and Shinjō
2	■ Rikuu East Line	for Furukawa and Kogota

== History ==
The station opened on 18 April 1915 as Narugo Station (鳴子駅). The station was absorbed into the JR East network upon the privatization of JNR on 1 April 1987. It was renamed Naruko-Onsen Station on 22 March 1997. 30th of November 2022 Midori no Madoguchi closes.

== Passenger statistics ==
In fiscal 2016, the station was used by an average of 226 passengers daily (boarding passengers only).

== Surrounding area ==
- National Route 47
- National Route 108
- Naruko Onsen
- Naruko Pass

== See also ==
- List of railway stations in Japan
