= Yūbikan =

Japanese structure of the Edo period

- 有備館
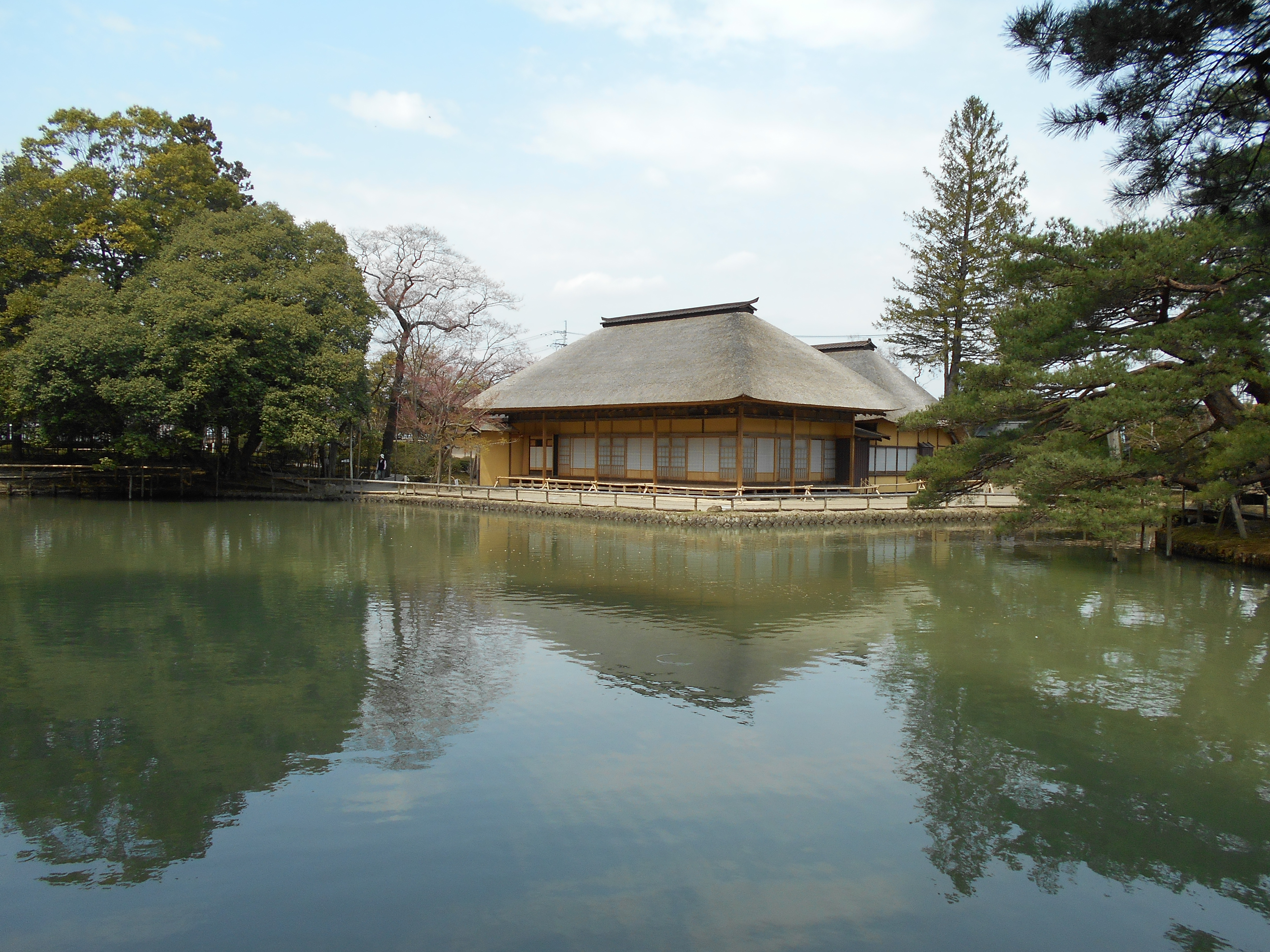
- Yūbikan in April 2016

- Location within Miyagi Prefecture Location within Japan

General information
- Architectural style: Shoin-zukuri
- Location: Ōsaki, Miyagi, Japan, Japan
- Coordinates: 38°39′27″N 140°51′49″E
- Inaugurated: 1677
- Owner: city of Ōsaki

The Yūbikan (有備館) is an Edo period structure located in what is now the city of Ōsaki, Miyagi Prefecture, Japan. It served as a han school for the Date clan of Sendai Domain, and is the oldest existing educational structure in Japan. The building, together with its surrounding gardens, were designated a nationally designated Historic Site and Place of Scenic Beauty in 1932.

== Overview ==
A predecessor of the Yūbikan was a han school originally constructed in 1633, within the second bailey of Iwadeyama Castle, by the second generation head of the Iwadeyama-branch of the Date clan, Date Munetoshi. Intended to serve as the domain's academy, it burned down and was rebuilt by the third generation head, Date Toshichika and was named Shungakukan (春学館). It was relocated to its present location in 1691 and was renamed Yūbikan.

The building is in the shoin-zukuri style of architecture, with a single story, plain wooden walls, and a thatched roof. After the Meiji restoration, a part of the building was renovated, but the original style remained unchanged. Repairs were made again in 1974.

The gardens were constructed by the Date clan's tea master Shimizu Dokan, under the fourth generation head, Date Murayasu in 1715. The garden is a walk-around garden containing a pond with a circumference of about 500meters, and employs the backdrop of the ruins of Iwadeyama Castle for borrowing of scenery ("shakkei"). It is rare example of a daimyō garden in the Tōhoku region.

The Yūbikan and its gardens remained property of the Date clan until 1970, when it was donated to the town of Iwadeyama, which later became part of the city of Ōsaki.

The Yūbikan main structure was severely damaged in the 2011 Tōhoku earthquake, during which 30 of its 33 supporting columns were damaged, causing the roof to collapse. Landslides also damaged parts of the gardens. The building and its gardens were repaired and reopened to the public in 2016.

It is a short walk from Yūbikan Station on the JR East Rikuu East Line.

== See also ==
- History of Education in Japan
- List of Historic Sites of Japan (Miyagi)
- List of Places of Scenic Beauty of Japan (Miyagi)
- Kōdōkan (Mito)
