= Mogami, Yamagata =

Mogami 最上町
- Town
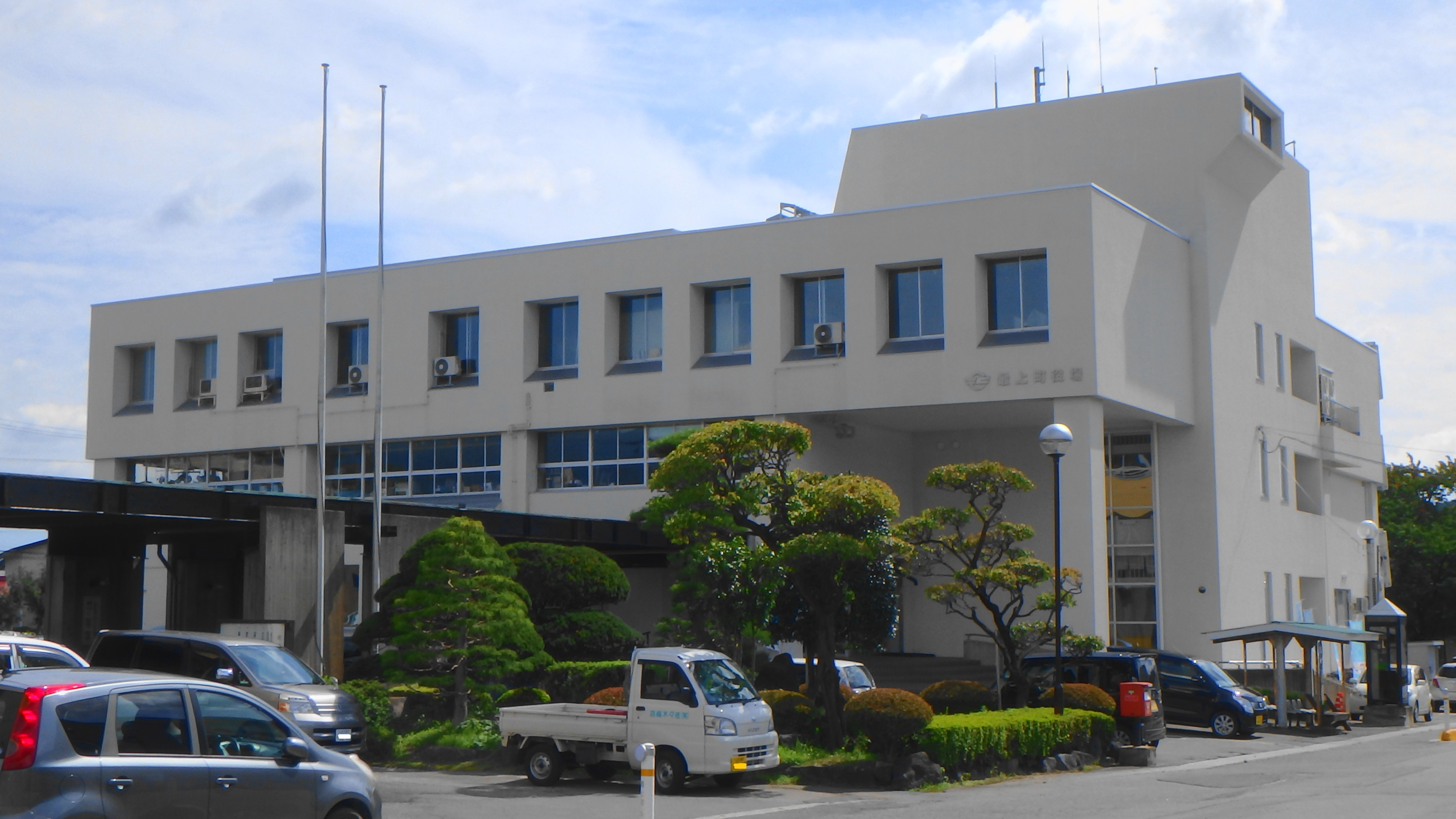
- Mogami Town Hall

- Flag Seal

- Location of Mogami in Yamagata Prefecture

- Coordinates: 38°45′30.7″N 140°31′9.4″E
- Country: Japan
- Region: Tōhoku
- Prefecture: Yamagata
- District: Mogami

Area
  - Total: 330.27 km^{2} (127.52 sq mi)

Population (February 2020)
  - Total: 8,442
  - Density: 25.56/km^{2} (66.20/sq mi)
- Time zone: UTC+9 (Japan Standard Time)
- Phone number: 0233-43-2111
- Address: 66 Mukai-machi, Mogami-machi, Mogami-gun, Yamagata-ken 999-6101
- Climate: Cfa/Dfa
- Website: Official website
- Symbols
- Bird: Copper pheasant
- Flower: Japanese gentian
- Tree: Japanese plum

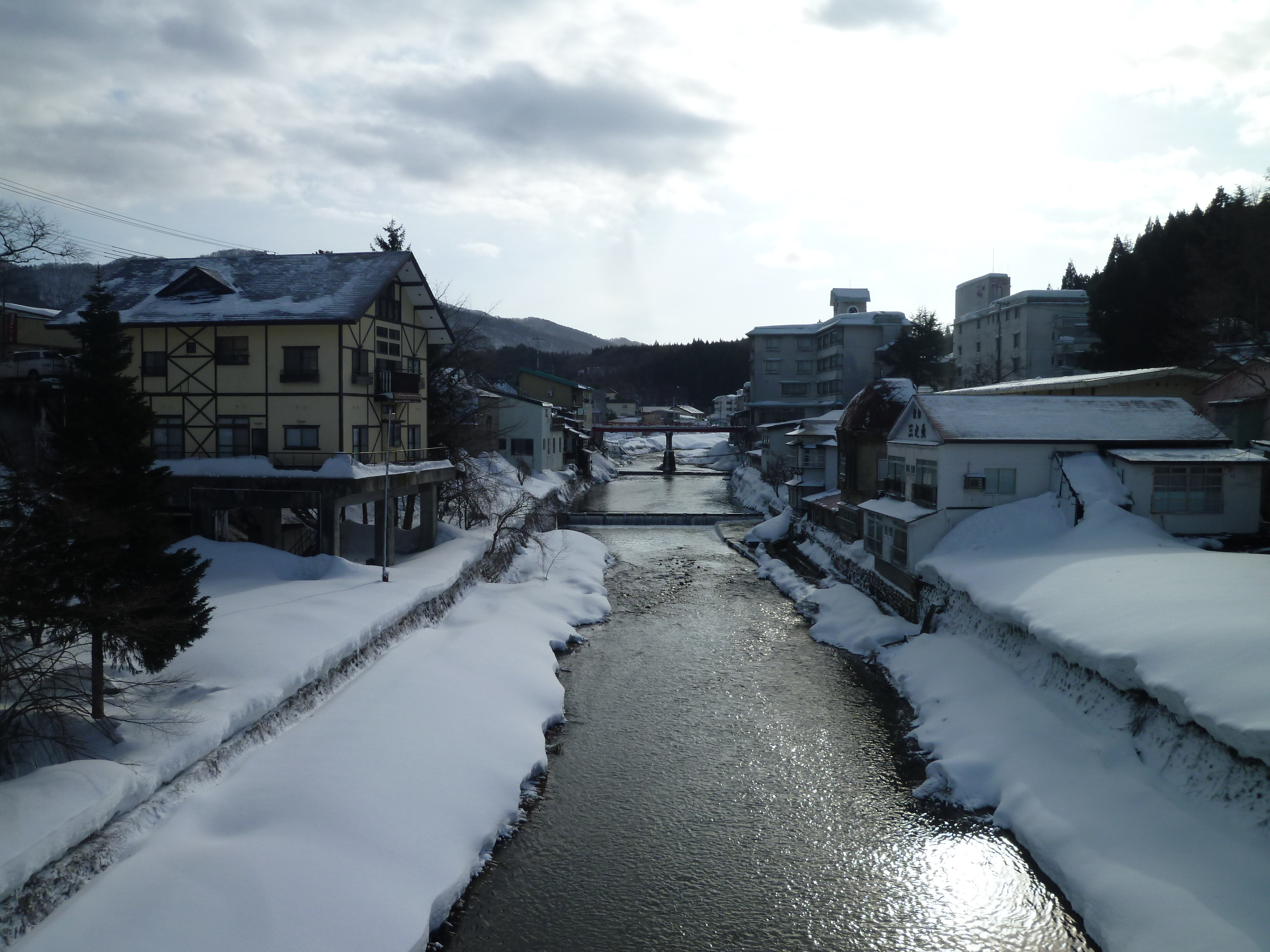
Akakura Onsen in Mogami

Mogami (最上町, Mogami-machi) is a town in Yamagata Prefecture, Japan. As of 29 February 2020, the town has an estimated population of 8,441 in 2,848 households, and a population density of 26 persons per km^{2}. The total area of the town is 330.27 square kilometres (128 sq mi).

== Geography ==
Mogami is located in the mountains of extreme northeastern Yamagata Prefecture. Despite its name, the Mogami River does not run through the town. The area is known for extremely heavy snows in winter.

=== Neighboring municipalities ===
- Akita Prefecture
  - Yuzawa
- Miyagi Prefecture
  - Kami
  - Ōsaki
- Yamagata Prefecture
  - Funagata
  - Obanazawa
  - Shinjō

=== Climate ===
Mogami has a humid continental climate (Köppen climate classification Cfa) with large seasonal temperature differences, with warm to hot (and often humid) summers and cold (sometimes severely cold) winters. Precipitation is significant throughout the year, but is heaviest from August to October. The average annual temperature in Mogami is 10.3 °C (50.5 °F). The average annual rainfall is 1,851.8 mm (72.91 in) with July as the wettest month. The temperatures are highest on average in August, at around 23.2 °C (73.8 °F), and lowest in January, at around −1.3 °C (29.7 °F).

Climate data for Mogami, elevation 212 m (696 ft), (1991−2020 normals, extremes 1976−present)
| Month | Jan | Feb | Mar | Apr | May | Jun | Jul | Aug | Sep | Oct | Nov | Dec | Year |
|---|---|---|---|---|---|---|---|---|---|---|---|---|---|
| Record high °C (°F) | 12.4 (54.3) | 14.2 (57.6) | 19.2 (66.6) | 27.6 (81.7) | 33.2 (91.8) | 33.3 (91.9) | 35.9 (96.6) | 36.0 (96.8) | 34.8 (94.6) | 28.9 (84.0) | 23.3 (73.9) | 16.8 (62.2) | 36.0 (96.8) |
| Mean daily maximum °C (°F) | 1.6 (34.9) | 2.6 (36.7) | 6.3 (43.3) | 13.6 (56.5) | 19.8 (67.6) | 23.5 (74.3) | 26.8 (80.2) | 28.3 (82.9) | 24.1 (75.4) | 18.0 (64.4) | 11.1 (52.0) | 4.4 (39.9) | 15.0 (59.0) |
| Daily mean °C (°F) | −1.3 (29.7) | −1.0 (30.2) | 1.9 (35.4) | 7.7 (45.9) | 13.9 (57.0) | 18.3 (64.9) | 22.1 (71.8) | 23.2 (73.8) | 19.1 (66.4) | 12.6 (54.7) | 6.3 (43.3) | 1.1 (34.0) | 10.3 (50.6) |
| Mean daily minimum °C (°F) | −4.3 (24.3) | −4.4 (24.1) | −2.1 (28.2) | 2.2 (36.0) | 8.5 (47.3) | 13.9 (57.0) | 18.4 (65.1) | 19.3 (66.7) | 15.1 (59.2) | 8.1 (46.6) | 2.1 (35.8) | −1.8 (28.8) | 6.2 (43.3) |
| Record low °C (°F) | −15.8 (3.6) | −15.1 (4.8) | −16.0 (3.2) | −8.9 (16.0) | −0.7 (30.7) | 3.5 (38.3) | 7.6 (45.7) | 10.0 (50.0) | 3.2 (37.8) | −1.9 (28.6) | −6.3 (20.7) | −14.5 (5.9) | −16.0 (3.2) |
| Average precipitation mm (inches) | 168.9 (6.65) | 116.6 (4.59) | 114.5 (4.51) | 104.1 (4.10) | 119.2 (4.69) | 137.2 (5.40) | 233.4 (9.19) | 197.6 (7.78) | 158.3 (6.23) | 148.2 (5.83) | 167.2 (6.58) | 188.2 (7.41) | 1,851.8 (72.91) |
| Average snowfall cm (inches) | 277 (109) | 212 (83) | 142 (56) | 17 (6.7) | 0 (0) | 0 (0) | 0 (0) | 0 (0) | 0 (0) | 0 (0) | 13 (5.1) | 173 (68) | 814 (320) |
| Average extreme snow depth cm (inches) | 108 (43) | 134 (53) | 104 (41) | 27 (11) | 0 (0) | 0 (0) | 0 (0) | 0 (0) | 0 (0) | 0 (0) | 6 (2.4) | 62 (24) | 136 (54) |
| Average precipitation days (≥ 1.0 mm) | 22.7 | 18.5 | 17.5 | 13.8 | 12.0 | 10.9 | 13.4 | 12.6 | 12.9 | 13.9 | 17.8 | 21.4 | 187.4 |
| Average snowy days (≥ 3 cm) | 22.2 | 19.2 | 16.6 | 2.2 | 0 | 0 | 0 | 0 | 0 | 0 | 1.7 | 13.9 | 75.8 |
| Mean monthly sunshine hours | 47.1 | 63.5 | 110.5 | 160.5 | 186.9 | 154.9 | 130.0 | 161.0 | 124.4 | 122.5 | 90.5 | 48.5 | 1,402.5 |
Source: Japan Meteorological Agency

== Demographics ==
Per Japanese census data, the population of Mogami peaked in the 1950s has declined by more half since then. The town is now less populous than it was a century ago.

Historical population
| Year | Pop. | ±% |
|---|---|---|
| 1920 | 12,384 | — |
| 1930 | 13,104 | +5.8% |
| 1940 | 13,867 | +5.8% |
| 1950 | 17,207 | +24.1% |
| 1960 | 16,833 | −2.2% |
| 1970 | 14,015 | −16.7% |
| 1980 | 13,190 | −5.9% |
| 1990 | 12,541 | −4.9% |
| 2000 | 11,483 | −8.4% |
| 2010 | 9,847 | −14.2% |
| 2020 | 8,080 | −17.9% |

== History ==
During the Sengoku period, the area was under the control of the Mogami clan who built Oguni Castle. During the Edo period, parts of the area came under the control of Shinjō Domain. After the start of the Meiji period, the area became part of Mogami District, Yamagata Prefecture. The villages of Higashi-Oguni and Nishi-Oguni were established on April 1, 1889, with the creation of the modern municipalities system. These villages merged to form the town of Mogami on September 1, 1954.

== Economy ==
Mogami was formerly known as a horse breeding area, and numerous ranches supplied horses to the Imperial Japanese Army's cavalry regiments. Modern Mogami is dependent on agriculture, forestry and seasonal tourism to its many hot spring resorts.

== Education ==
Mogami has two public elementary schools and one public middle school operated by the city government and one public high school operated by the Yamagata Prefectural Board of Education.

== Transportation ==
=== Railways ===
East Japan Railway Company - Rikuu East Line

- Sakaida - Akakura-Onsen - Tachikōji - Mogami - Ōhori - Usugi - Semi-Onsen

=== Highways ===
- National Route 47
