= Rikuu East Line =

Railway line in Miyagi & Yamagata Prefectures, Japan

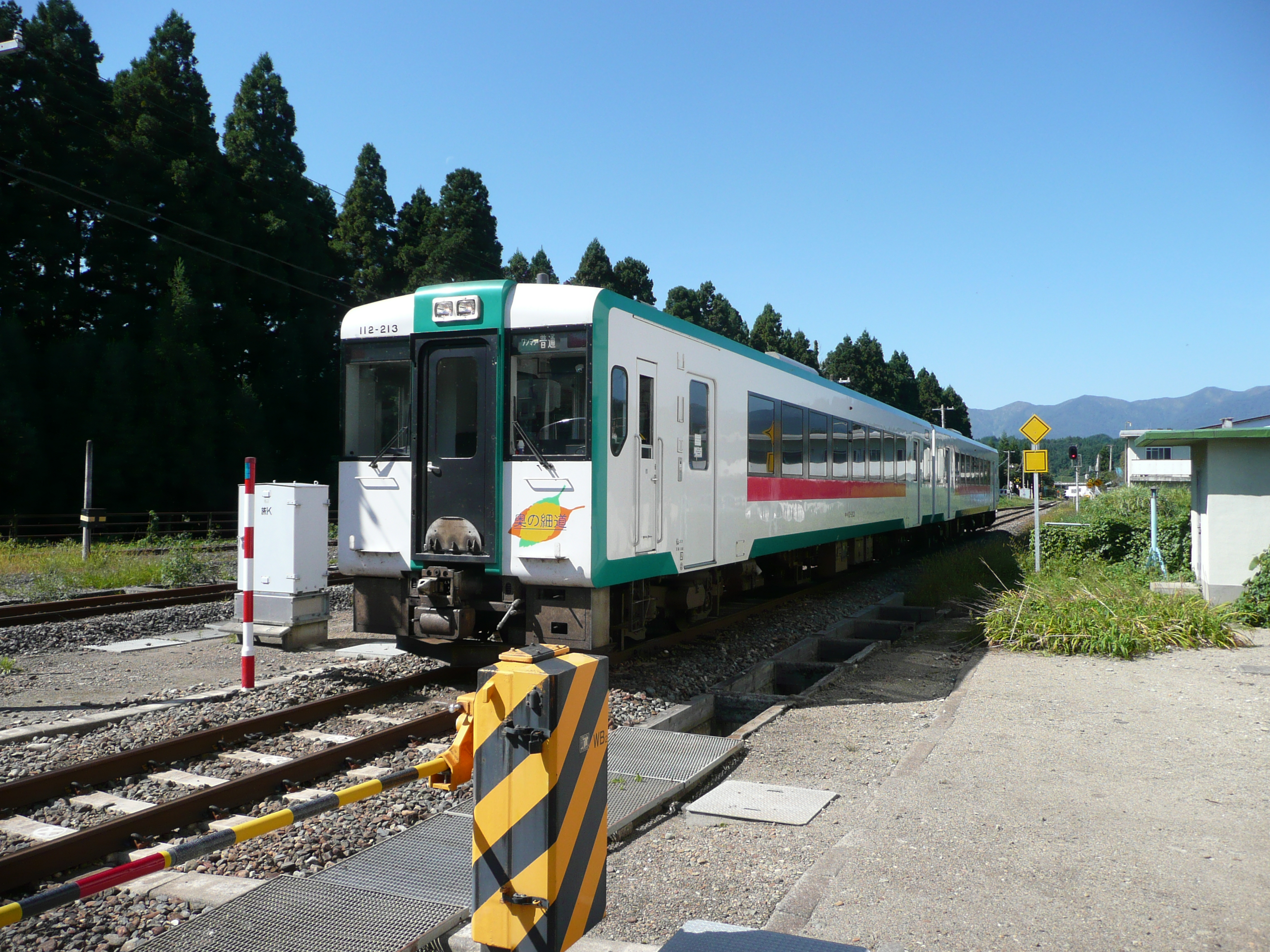
- A Rikuu East Line diesel train near Mogami Station

Overview
- Native name: 陸羽東線
- Status: In operation
- Owner: JR East
- Locale: Miyagi and Yamagata Prefectures, Japan
- Termini: Kogota; Shinjō
- Stations: 27

Service
- Type: Heavy rail
- Operator(s): JR East
- Depot(s): Kogota
- Rolling stock: KiHa 110 series DMU

History
- Opened: 1913

Technical
- Line length: 94.1 km (58.5 mi)
- Number of tracks: Entire line single tracked
- Character: Rural
- Track gauge: 1,067 mm (3 ft 6 in)
- Electrification: None
- Operating speed: 95 km/h (59 mph) (Kogota - Naruko-Onsen); 85 km/h (53 mph) (Naruko-Onsen - Shinjō)
Route map

The Rikuu East Line (陸羽東線, Rikuu-tō-sen) is a railway line in Japan, operated by the East Japan Railway Company (JR East). It connects Kogota Station in Misato, Miyagi Prefecture to Shinjō Station in Shinjō, Yamagata Prefecture, acting as a connector between the Tōhoku Main Line, Ōu Main Line, and Tōhoku Shinkansen in the southern Tōhoku region, and provides access to north-western Miyagi Prefecture and north-eastern Yamagata Prefecture.

Its name refers to the ancient provinces of Mutsu (陸奥) and Dewa (出羽) (or alternatively, the Meiji period provinces of Rikuzen (陸前) and Uzen (羽前)), which the line connects.

Due to heavy rainfall in July 2024, all services on the section of the line between Naruko-Onsen and the terminus Shinjō are currently suspended.

== History ==
The Kogota - Naruko-Onsen section was opened in stages between 1913 and 1915, with the Shinjo - Naruko-Onsen section opened in stages between 1915 and 1917.

CTC signalling was commissioned in 1983, and freight services ceased in 1987.

The line celebrated its 100th anniversary on November 3, 2017, with a special train hauled by JNR Class DE10 locomotives.

=== Former connecting lines ===
- Nishi-Furukawa station - A 2 ft 6 in (762 mm) narrow gauge line ultimately extending 44 km (27 mi) to Tori-Machi, and connecting to the Senzan Line at Toshogu station, was opened by the Sendai City Council between 1922 and 1929. It closed in sections between 1937 and 1960.

== Station list ==
Station	Japanese	Distance (km)	Transfers		Location	
Kogota	小牛田	0.0	■ Tōhoku Main Line; ■ Ishinomaki Line	∨	Misato	Miyagi Prefecture
Kitaura	北浦	4.5		◇	Misato	Miyagi Prefecture
Rikuzen-Yachi	陸前谷地	6.6		｜	Misato	Miyagi Prefecture
Furukawa	古川	9.4	Tōhoku Shinkansen	◇	Ōsaki	Miyagi Prefecture
Tsukanome	塚目	12.1		｜	Ōsaki	Miyagi Prefecture
Nishi-Furukawa	西古川	15.9		◇	Ōsaki	Miyagi Prefecture
Higashi-Ōsaki	東大崎	19.1		｜	Ōsaki	Miyagi Prefecture
Nishi-Ōsaki	西大崎	21.9		｜	Ōsaki	Miyagi Prefecture
Iwadeyama	岩出山	24.8		◇	Ōsaki	Miyagi Prefecture
Yūbikan	有備館	25.8		｜	Ōsaki	Miyagi Prefecture
Kaminome	上野目	28.6		｜	Ōsaki	Miyagi Prefecture
Ikezuki	池月	32.4		◇	Ōsaki	Miyagi Prefecture
Kawatabi-Onsen	川渡温泉	38.8		◇	Ōsaki	Miyagi Prefecture
Naruko-Gotenyu	鳴子御殿湯	42.7		｜	Ōsaki	Miyagi Prefecture
Naruko-Onsen	鳴子温泉	44.9		◇	Ōsaki	Miyagi Prefecture
Nakayamadaira-Onsen	中山平温泉	50.0		｜	Ōsaki	Miyagi Prefecture
Sakaida	堺田	55.3		｜	Mogami	Yamagata Prefecture
Akakura-Onsen	赤倉温泉	61.1		｜	Mogami	Yamagata Prefecture
Tachikōji	立小路	62.8		｜	Mogami	Yamagata Prefecture
Mogami	最上	65.6		◇	Mogami	Yamagata Prefecture
Ōhori	大堀	69.5		｜	Mogami	Yamagata Prefecture
Usugi	鵜杉	71.5		｜	Mogami	Yamagata Prefecture
Semi-Onsen	瀬見温泉	75.0		｜	Mogami	Yamagata Prefecture
Higashi-Nagasawa	東長沢	81.0		｜	Funagata	Yamagata Prefecture
Nagasawa	長沢	82.8		｜	Funagata	Yamagata Prefecture
Minami-Shinjō	南新庄	89.2		｜	Shinjō	Yamagata Prefecture
Shinjō	新庄	94.1	Yamagata Shinkansen; ■ Ōu Main Line; ■ Rikuu West Line	｜	Shinjō	Yamagata Prefecture

Symbols:

- ｜ - Single-track
- ◇ - Single-track; station where trains can pass
- ∨ - Single-track section starts from this point

== Rolling stock ==
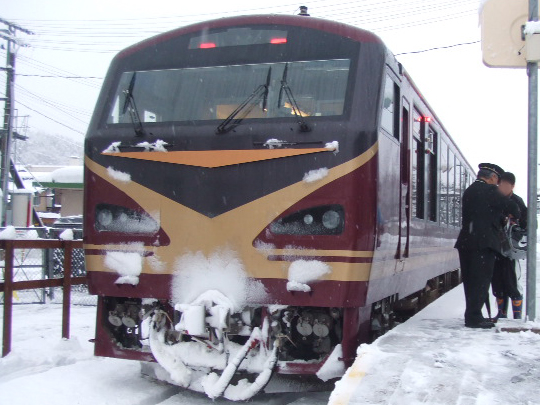
Resort Minori (This train was withdrawn 10 August 2020)

- KiHa 110 series DMUs

=== Past ===
- Resort Minori
