= Tohru Mogami =

Japanese engineer

Tohru Mogami from Selete, Inc. in Tsukuba, Japan was named a Fellow of the Institute of Electrical and Electronics Engineers (IEEE) in 2012 for his work in surface-channel pMOSFET and nanoscale transistor technology.
