= Mogami Station =

Railway station in Mogami, Yamagata Prefecture, Japan

Mogami Station 最上駅
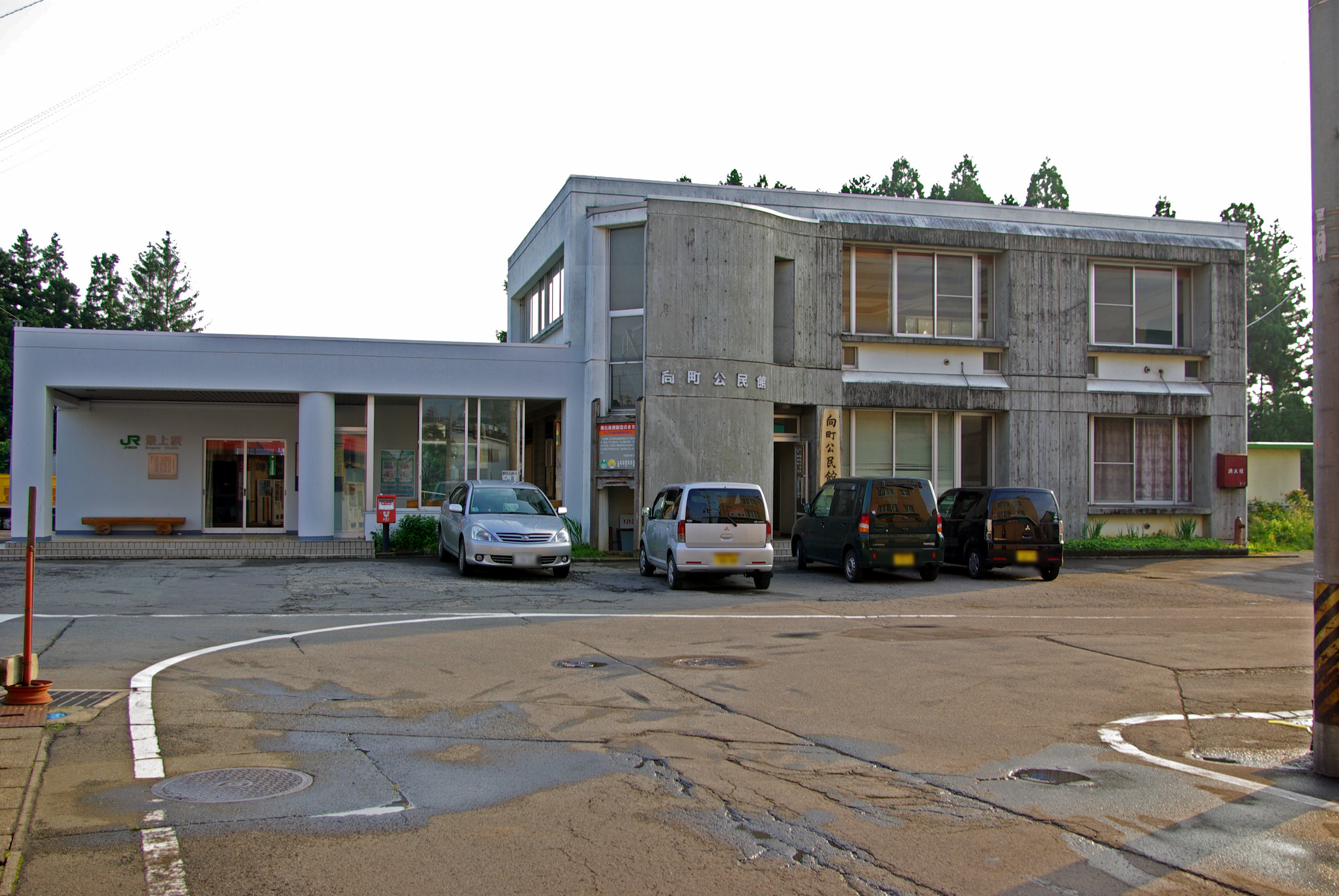
- Mogami Station in July 2009

General information
- Location: Mukaimachi, Mogami-machi, Mogami-gun, Yamagata-ken 999-6101; Japan
- Coordinates: 38.7562°N 140.5176°E
- Operator: JR East
- Line: ■ Rikuu East Line
- Distance: 65.6 kilometers from Kogota
- Platforms: 1 island platform

Other information
- Status: Unstaffed
- Website: Official website

History
- Opened: August 1, 1916
- Former names: Uzen-Mukaimachi (until 1999)

Passengers
- FY2004: 143

Services
Preceding station	JR East	Following station
Ōhori towards Shinjō	Rikuu East Line	Tachikōji towards Kogota
Location
- Location within Yamagata Prefecture Location within Japan

Mogami Station (最上駅, Mogami-eki) is a railway station in the town of Mogami, Yamagata, Japan, operated by East Japan Railway Company (JR East).

== Lines ==
Mogami Station is served by the Rikuu East Line, and is located 65.6 rail kilometers from the terminus of the line at Kogota Station.

== Station layout ==
The station has one island platform, connected to the station building by a level crossing. The station is staffed, and the station building incorporates the Mogami Public Hall.

A piano was installed in the station in 2021, which came from a defunct elementary school.

=== Platforms ===
1	■ Rikuu East Line	for Naruko-Onsen and Kogota
2	■ Rikuu East Line	for Shinjō

== History ==
Mogami Station opened on August 1, 1916 as Uzen-Mukaimachi Station (羽前向町駅, Uzen-Mukaimachi eki). The station was absorbed into the JR East network upon the privatization of JNR on April 1, 1987. It was renamed to its present name on December 4, 1999.

== Passenger statistics ==
In fiscal 2018, the station was used by an average of 143 passengers daily (boarding passengers only).

== Surrounding area ==
- National Route 47
- Mogami Town Hall
- Mogami Post Office

== See also ==
- List of railway stations in Japan
