= Furukawa Station =

Railway station in Ōsaki, Miyagi Prefecture, Japan

Furukawa Station 古川駅
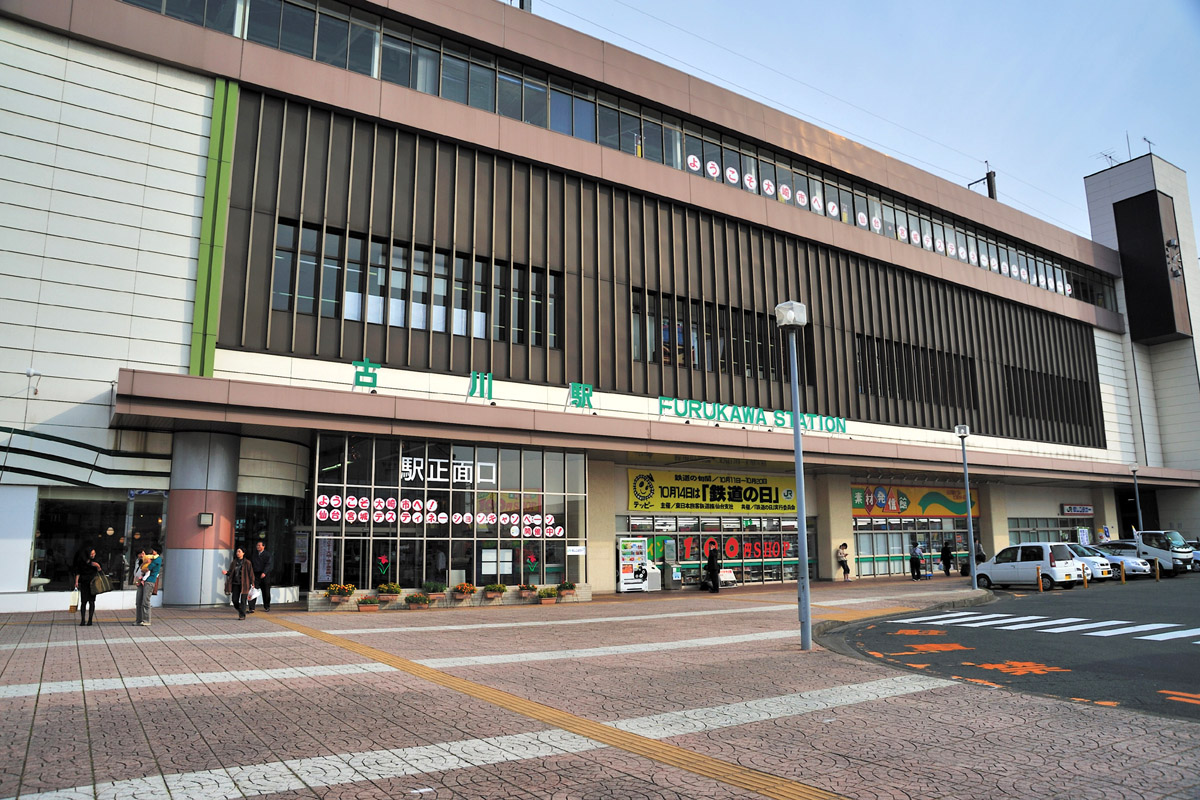

General information
- Location: 1-7-35 Furukawa-ekimae Ōdōri, Ōsaki-shi, Miyagi-ken 989-6162; Japan
- Coordinates: 38.570582°N 140.967722°E
- Operator: JR East
- Lines: Tōhoku Shinkansen; Rikuu East Line
- Distance: 395.0 km (245.4 mi) from Tokyo
- Platforms: 2 side + 1 island platforms
- Tracks: 4

Other information
- Status: Staffed (Midori no Madoguchi)
- Website: Official website

History
- Opened: April 20, 1913; 113 years ago

Passengers
- FY2018: 4,879 daily

Services
Preceding station	JR East	Following station
Sendai towards Tokyo	Tōhoku Shinkansen Hayabusa	Kurikoma-Kōgen towards Shin-Aomori
Sendai towards Tokyo	Tōhoku Shinkansen Yamabiko	Kurikoma-Kōgen towards Morioka
Tsukanome towards Shinjō	Rikuu East Line	Rikuzen-Yachi towards Kogota
Location
- Location within Miyagi Prefecture Location within Japan

Furukawa Station (古川駅, Furukawa-eki) is a junction railway station in the city of Ōsaki, Miyagi, Japan, operated by the East Japan Railway Company (JR East).

== Lines ==
Furukawa Station is served by the Tōhoku Shinkansen high-speed line from Tokyo to Shin-Aomori, and also by the local East Rikuu Line. It is 395.0 kilometers from Tokyo.

== Station layout ==
The Rikuu East Line has a single ground-level island platform at a right angle to the station building and the Shinkansen platforms. The elevated Shinkansen station has two side platforms serving two tracks. The platforms are equipped with platform screen doors. The station has a "Midori no Madoguchi" staffed ticket office.

=== Platforms ===
1	■ Rikuu East Line	for Kogota
2	■ Rikuu East Line	for Naruko-Onsen and Shinjō

11	■ Tōhoku Shinkansen	for Morioka, Shin-Aomori, Akita and Shin-Hakodate
12	■ Tōhoku Shinkansen	for Sendai and Tokyo

== History ==
The station opened on April 20, 1913. On June 11, 1915, it was renamed Rikuzen-Furukawa Station (陸前古川駅). On November 1, 1980, the station name was changed back to Furukawa Station, and the station was relocated to its present location. Tohoku Shinkansen services started on June 23, 1982. The station was absorbed into the JR East network upon the privatization of the Japanese National Railways (JNR) on April 1, 1987.

== Passenger statistics ==
In fiscal 2018, the station was used by an average of 4,879 passengers daily (boarding passengers only).

== Surrounding area ==
- central Ōsaki city
- Furukawa Post Office

== See also ==
- List of railway stations in Japan
