= Japan National Route 47 =

National highway in Japan

National Route 47
- 国道47号

Route information
- Length: 173.6 km (107.9 mi)
- Existed: 1 April 1963–present

Major junctions
- National Route 45; National Route 4 National Route 108; National Route 347; National Route 457; National Route 13; National Route 458; National Route 345; National Route 7

Location
- Country: Japan

Highway system
- National highways of Japan; Expressways of Japan
← National Route 46	→ National Route 48

National Route 47 is a national highway of Japan connecting Miyagino-ku, Sendai and Sakata, Yamagata.

== Route data ==
- Length: 173.6 km (107.87 mi).

== History ==
Route 47 was originally designated on 18 May 1953 as a section of Route 108; this was redesignated as Route 47 when the route was promoted to a Class 1 highway.
