= Kogota Station =

Railway station in Misato, Miyagi Prefecture, Japan

Kogota Station 小牛田駅
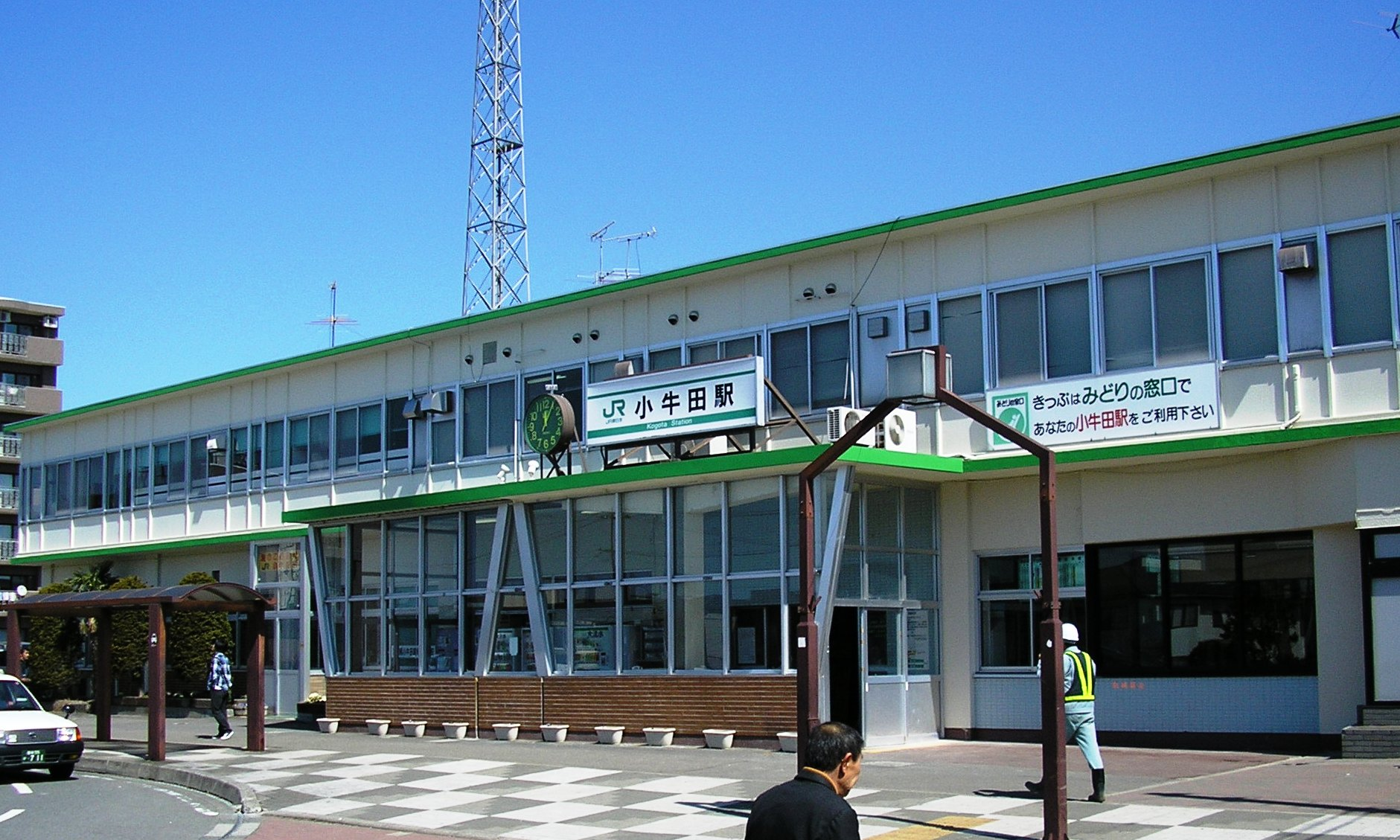
- Kogota Station, June 2006

General information
- Location: Fujigasaki, Misato-machi, Tōda-gun, Miyagi-ken 987-0001; Japan
- Coordinates: 38°32′26″N 141°03′52″E
- Operator: JR East
- Lines: ■ Tōhoku Main Line; ■ Ishinomaki Line; ■ Rikuu East Line
- Distance: 395 km from Tokyo
- Platforms: 2 island platform
- Tracks: 4

Other information
- Status: Staffed ("Midori no Madoguchi" )
- Website: Official website

History
- Opened: April 16, 1890

Passengers
- FY2018: 2066

Services
Preceding station	JR East	Following station
Matsuyamamachi towards Kuroiso	Tōhoku Main Line Local	Tajiri towards Morioka
Terminus	Ishinomaki Line	Kami-Wakuya towards Onagawa
Terminus	Kesennuma Line	Kami-Wakuya towards Yanaizu
Kitaura towards Shinjō	Rikuu East Line	Terminus
Location
- Location within Miyagi Prefecture Location within Japan

Kogota Station (小牛田駅, Kogota-eki) is a junction railway station in the town of Misato, Miyagi, Japan, operated by East Japan Railway Company (JR East).

== Lines ==
Kogota Station is served by three lines: the Tōhoku Main Line, the Ishinomaki Line, and the Rikuu East Line. It is located 395.0 rail kilometers from the terminus of the Tōhoku Main Line at Tokyo Station. It is the eastern terminus of the Rikuu East Line and the western terminus of the Ishinomaki Line. Most Kesennuma Line trains use Kogota station as their operating terminus, although the line physically ends at Maeyachi Station.

== Station layout ==
Kogota Station has two island platforms serving four tracks. The platforms are connected by a footbridge. The station has a "Midori no Madoguchi" staffed ticket office.

=== Platforms ===
1	■ Rikuu East Line	for Furukawa, Naruko-Onsen, and Shinjō
1	■ Tōhoku Main Line	for Matsushima, Sendai, and Fukushima
2,3	■ Tōhoku Main Line	for Matsushima, Sendai, and Fukushima for Semine, Ishikoshi, and Ichinoseki
4	■ Ishinomaki Line	for Maeyachi, Ishinomaki, and Onagawa
4	■ Kesennuma Line	for Yanaizu (temporarily suspended)
4	■ Tōhoku Main Line	for Sendai (rapid services)
4	■ Rikuu East Line	for Furukawa (direct services)

== History ==
Kogota Station opened on April 16, 1890, on what would become the Tōhoku Main Line. The Ishinomaki Line opened on October 28, 1912, and the Rikuu Line (Rikuu East Line) opened on April 20, 1913. The station was absorbed into the JR East network upon the privatization of JNR on April 1, 1987.

== Passenger statistics ==
In fiscal 2018, the station was used by an average of 2,066 passengers daily (boarding passengers only).

== Surrounding area ==
- Kogota Post Office
- National Route 108

== See also ==
- List of railway stations in Japan
