= Ishinomaki Saint John the Apostle Orthodox Church =

Coordinates: 38.429144°N 141.311113°E

- 石巻ハリストス正教会 聖使徒イオアン聖堂
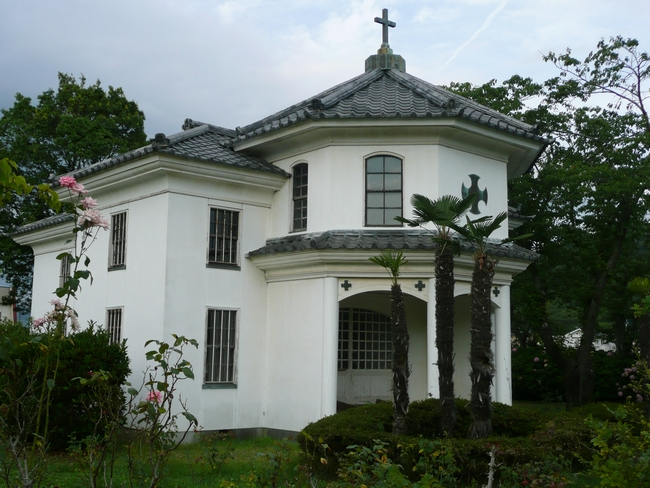
- Ishinomaki Saint John the Apostle Orthodox Church
- Ishinomaki Saint John the Apostle Orthodox Church
- Location: Ishinomaki, Miyagi
- Country: Japan
- Denomination: Eastern Orthodox (Russian Orthodox Church

History
- Founded: 8 March 1891

Architecture
- Functional status: Active
- Style: Byzantine Revival
- Completed: 1880

The Ishinomaki Saint John the Apostle Orthodox Church (石巻ハリストス正教会 聖使徒イオアン聖堂, Ishinomaki Harisutosu Seikyōkai, Sei-shito Ioan Seidō)) is an Orthodox Church in the city of Ishinomaki, Miyagi, in the Tōhoku region of northern Japan. It is dedicated to St. John the Apostle. The original structure was built in 1880. It is the oldest wooden church building among existing wooden churches in Japan.

After the establishment of the Japanese Orthodox Church by Ivan Dmitrievich Kasatkin (1836-1912), later St. Nicholas of Japan, in Kanda, Tokyo in the early Meiji period, he gathered a number of disciples, some of whom were from the Oshika District in what s now part of the city of Ishinomaki. Led by Watanabe Takuma, 29 men from the area were baptised in 1877, leading to the construction of a small church building, and 22 more converts were made the following year. Within the next 20 years a total of 10 churches were established in the area. However, the popularity of the religion suffered a tremendous setback due to the Russo-Japanese War of 1904–1905, and the establishment of the Soviet Union in 1917, and many of the churches were subsequently closed.

The Saint John the Apostle Orthodox Church was completed in 1880. The architect is unknown, and was possibly a local parishioner. The structure has a cross-shaped floor plan, with a tiled roof. The first floor meeting room is covered in tatami mats. The sanctuary is on the second floor, which is carpeted, and connected to the first floor by a steep staircase. The exterior of the building is whitewashed, and has a columned octagonal portico often found in Western style architecture of the Meiji era.

As the church building was damaged by the 1978 Miyagi earthquake, it was reconstructed in a new location on an island in the middle of the Kitakami River as part of park which includes the Ishinomori Manga Museum. It was declared an Important Cultural Property of Ishinomaki City in 1990 and opened to the public in July 2001. However, during the 2011 Tōhoku earthquake and tsunami, the site was severely damaged, with flood waters reaching the second story. Restoration work was completed in 2016.

== References and sources ==
- 八木谷涼子・編『別冊太陽 日本の教会をたずねて II』平凡社 ISBN 4-582-92127-2

== See also ==
- Holy Resurrection Cathedral (Nicholai-do) - Metropolitan Cathedral of the Orthodox Church in Japan
