= Oshika (disambiguation) =

Oshika (jap. 牡鹿 or 大鹿) may refer to:

== Places ==
- Oshika District, Miyagi, a rural district in Miyagi Prefecture, Japan.
- Oshika Peninsula, a peninsula in Miyagi Prefecture, Japan.
- Ōshika, Nagano, a village located in Nagano Prefecture, Japan.

== People ==
- Toki Oshika (大鹿 統毅; born 2005), Japanese kickboxer
