= Mukaida =

Mukaida (written: 向田, 向井田 and 迎田) is a Japanese surname. Notable people with the surname include:

- Mai Mukaida (向田 麻衣, born 1982), Japanese make-up artist and businesswoman
- Mayu Mukaida (向田 真優, born 1997), Japanese sport wrestler
