= Typhoon Kirogi (2000) =

Pacific typhoon in 2000

Typhoon Kirogi (Ditang)
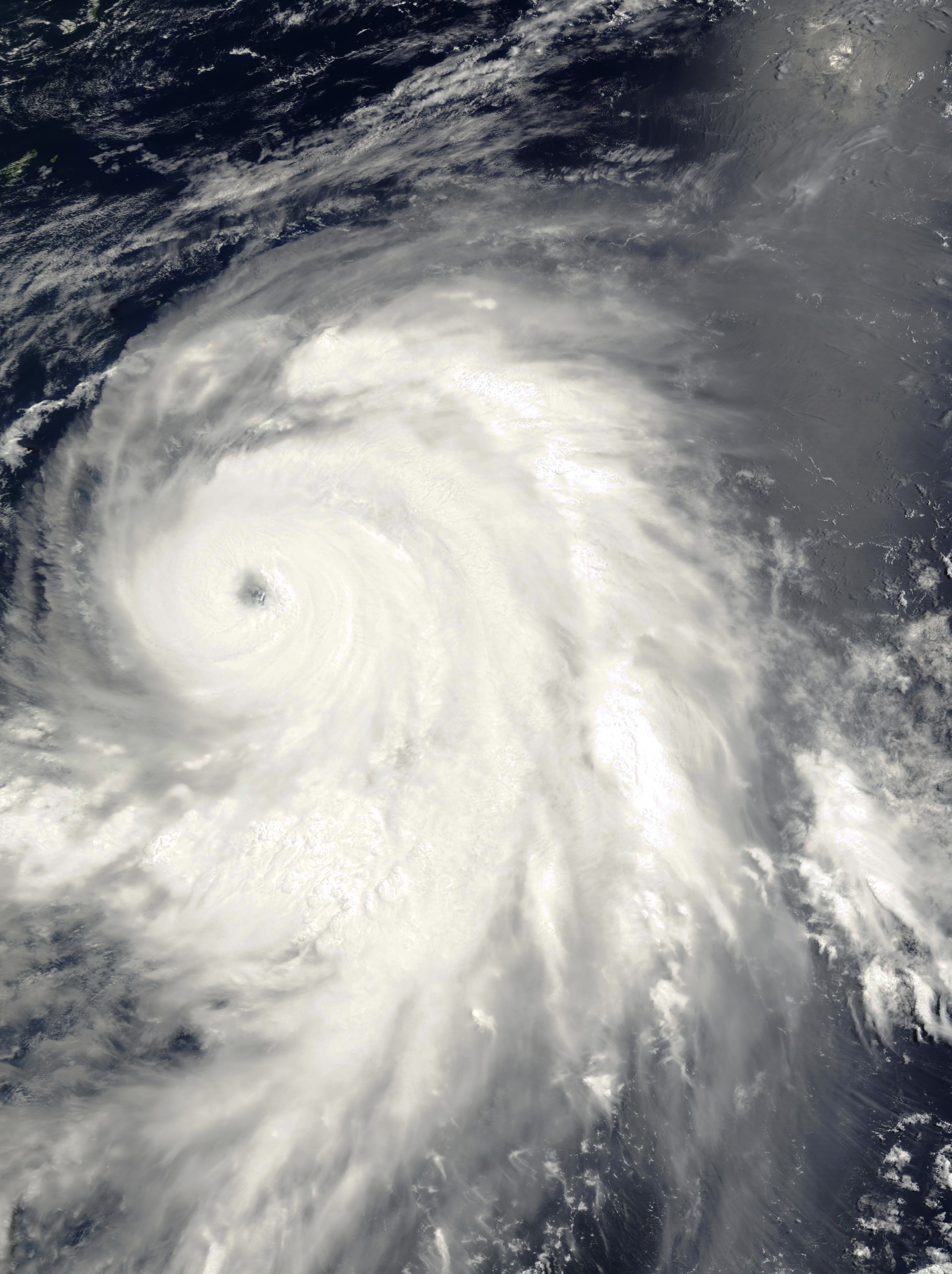
- Typhoon Kirogi at peak intensity on July 5

Meteorological history
- Formed: July 2, 2000
- Extratropical: July 8, 2000
- Dissipated: July 10, 2000

Very strong typhoon
- 10-minute sustained (JMA)
- Highest winds: 155 km/h (100 mph)
- Lowest pressure: 940 hPa (mbar); 27.76 inHg

Category 4-equivalent typhoon
- 1-minute sustained (SSHWS/JTWC)
- Highest winds: 215 km/h (130 mph)

Overall effects
- Fatalities: 3 total
- Damage: $505 million (2000 USD)
- Areas affected: Japan
- IBTrACS
- Part of the 2000 Pacific typhoon season

Typhoon Kirogi was a large typhoon that caused severe damage in Japan during early July 2000. Forming out of an area of disturbed weather on June 30, Kirogi initially tracked slowly towards the north. On July 3, the storm underwent rapid intensification and attained Category 4 status on the Saffir–Simpson Hurricane Scale the next day, according to the JTWC. On July 5, the Japan Meteorological Agency (JMA) assessed the storm to have reached its peak intensity with 10-minute sustained winds of 155 km/h (100 mph) and a barometric pressure of 940 hPa (27.76 inHg). Over the following several days, the storm tracked towards the northeast and accelerated towards Japan. Early on July 8, Kirogi brushed eastern Japan before transitioning into an extratropical cyclone.

Initial news reports stated that Kirogi produced deadly flooding in the Philippines; however, the storm was too far from the country to have any impacts. The storm was also named Ditang in the Philippines. In Japan, Kirogi produced torrential rainfall and high winds, killing three people and leaving ¥54.4 billion (2000 JPY, $505 million USD) in damages. Flooding inundated nearly 1,300 homes around Tokyo and high winds cut power to roughly 20,000 residences. Three homes were destroyed in a landslide on Kozushima.

== Meteorological history ==
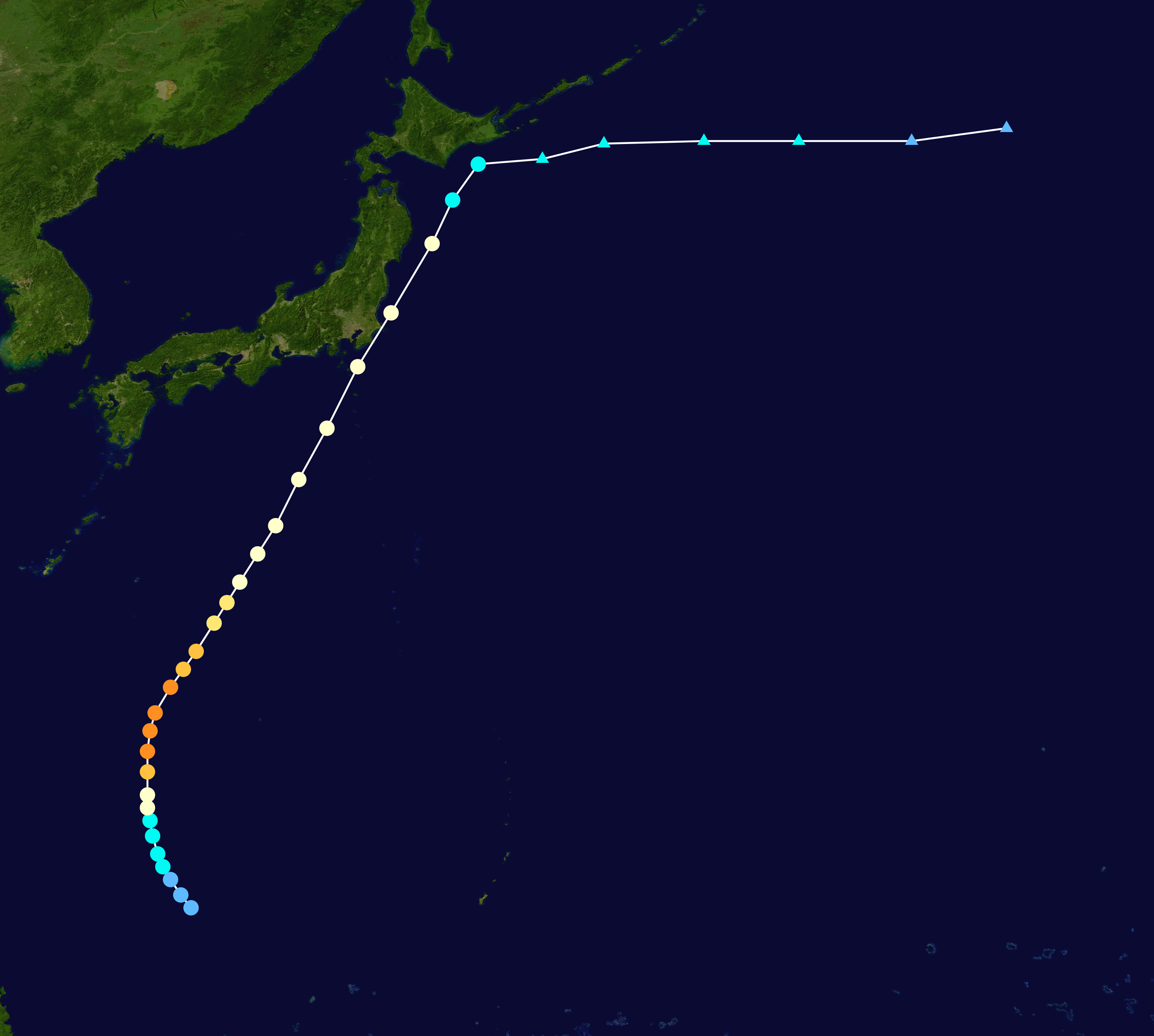
Map plotting the storm's track and intensity, according to the Saffir–Simpson scale Map key Saffir–Simpson scale Tropical depression (≤38 mph, ≤62 km/h) Tropical storm (39–73 mph, 63–118 km/h) Category 1 (74–95 mph, 119–153 km/h) Category 2 (96–110 mph, 154–177 km/h) Category 3 (111–129 mph, 178–208 km/h) Category 4 (130–156 mph, 209–251 km/h) Category 5 (≥157 mph, ≥252 km/h) Unknown Storm type Tropical cyclone Subtropical cyclone Extratropical cyclone, remnant low, tropical disturbance, or monsoon depression

Typhoon Kirogi originated out of a disorganized area of showers and thunderstorms on June 30, 2000, associated with a weak area of low pressure, situated roughly 650 km (400 mi) east of the Philippine island of Mindanao. The system remained nearly stationary for two days as it became increasingly organized. On July 1, the Joint Typhoon Warning Center (JTWC) issued a Tropical Cyclone Formation Alert as they anticipated the low to develop into a significant tropical cyclone within 24 hours. Around 0600 UTC the following day, the Japan Meteorological Agency (JMA) began monitoring the system as a tropical depression. At the same time, the JTWC also classified the system as Tropical Depression 05W and six hours later, the Philippine Atmospheric, Geophysical and Astronomical Services Administration (PAGASA) began issuing advisories on the same system, classifying it as Tropical Depression Ditang.

Throughout the day on July 2, the depression began to take a slow northward track in response to a mid-level subtropical ridge to the east and later that day, the JTWC upgraded it to a tropical storm. Early the next day, the JMA also upgraded the system to a tropical storm, at which time it received the name Kirogi. (Note: The name Kirogi (Korean: 기러기, [kiɾɔɡi]) was contributed by North Korea and refers to a wild goose in Korean.) Although a broad cyclone, convection was gradually wrapping around the southern periphery of the circulation. Several hours after being named, the JMA upgraded Kirogi to a severe tropical storm and later a typhoon. At the same time, the JTWC classified the storm as a typhoon. Upon being upgraded the typhoon featured a well-developed outflow and prominent banding features consolidating around the system.

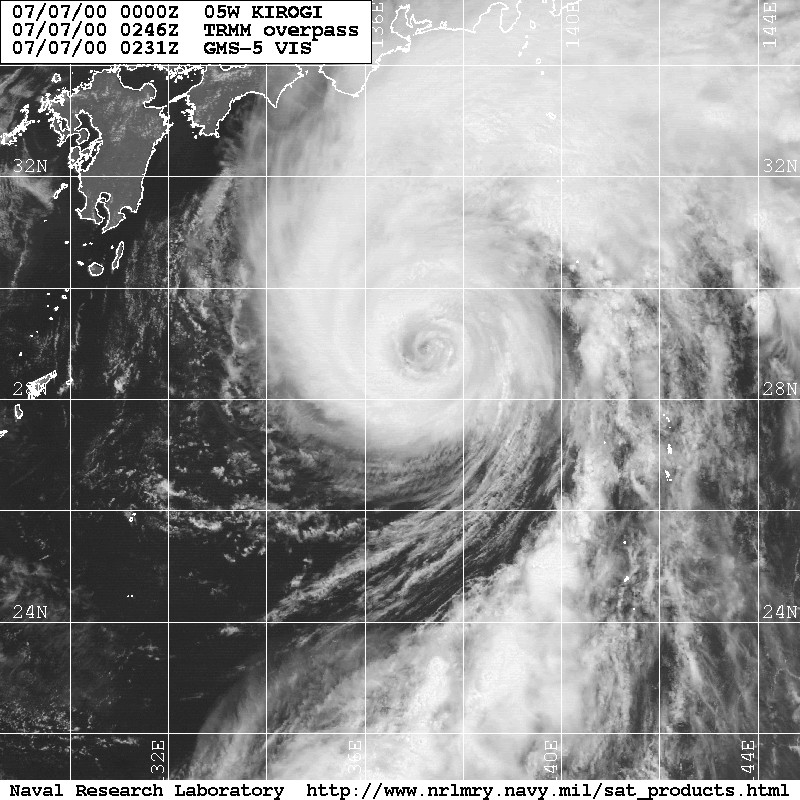
Typhoon Kirogi approaching Japan on July 7

Not long after attaining typhoon intensity, Kirogi began to undergo rapid intensification. Roughly 18 hours later, the JTWC reported that the storm had attained its peak intensity with 1-minute sustained winds of 215 km/h (130 mph), equivalent to a Category 4 hurricane on the Saffir–Simpson Hurricane Scale. By this time, the typhoon was situated roughly 870 km (540 mi) southeast of Okinawa. The storm featured a 59 km (37 mi) wide symmetrical eye. Early on July 5, the JMA reported that Kirogi attained its peak intensity with 10-minute sustained winds of 155 km/h (100 mph) and a barometric pressure of 940 hPa (27.76 inHg). The storm was a relatively large typhoon, with a gale diameter of 520 km (320 mi).

Several hours after attaining peak intensity on July 5, a mid-level trough caused convection around the center of Kirogi to weaken and the eye became cloud-filled. Later in the day, most of the convective bands were confined to the eastern periphery of the system. Around this time, the storm took a northeasterly track, which it maintained for several days. Increasing in forward motion, the storm began to weaken; however, it also grew in size. By July 6, the storm had a gale-diameter of 925 km (575 mi). Gradual weakening took place as Kirogi tracked towards Japan, with both the JTWC and JMA reporting sustained winds at 140 km/h (85 mph) by July 7. Early on July 8, the storm brushed the eastern coast of Japan near Chōshi, Chiba with 10-minute sustained winds of 150 km/h (90 mph). Several hours later, the typhoon weakened to a severe tropical storm before transitioning into an extratropical cyclone near the southeast coast of Hokkaido. By this time, the storm took a sharp eastward turn and briefly slowed before re-accelerating. The remnants of the storm persisted until July 10, at which time it dissipated to the southwest of the Aleutian Islands.

== Preparations and impact ==
=== Philippines ===
CNN and the Los Angeles Times reported that the storm produced heavy rainfall in the Philippines, resulting in fatalities. However, a meteorological analysis of the storm showed that Kirogi was not responsible for the rain; instead, a monsoon depression that later became Typhoon Kai-tak caused the flooding rains. Typhoon Kirogi was never closer than 835 km (519 mi) from the Philippines. However, large swells produced by the storm caused moderate damage along coastal areas of the Philippines, forcing workers in Manila to clear debris left by the damaging waves.

=== Japan ===
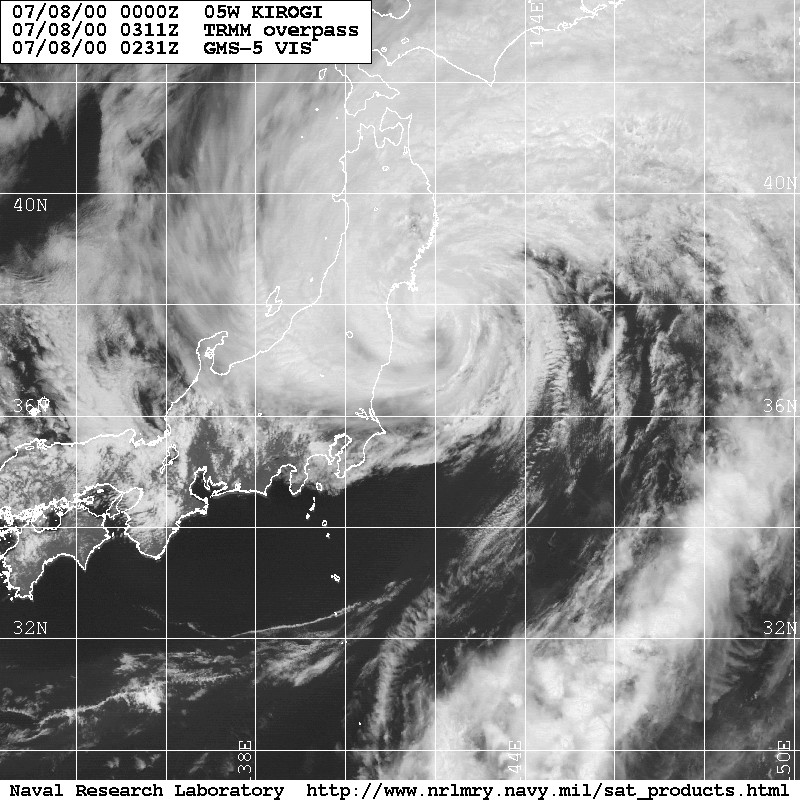
Severe Tropical Storm Kirogi brushing Japan on July 8

In Japan, Kirogi became the first typhoon to threaten the city of Tokyo since a storm in the 1989 Pacific typhoon season, prompting hundreds of residents to evacuate. A total of 120 flights were canceled ahead of the storm and 30 ferry services were halted due to rough seas up to 9 m (30 ft). In Kozushima, 788 residents were evacuated as heavy rain from the typhoon produced landslides. Forecasters warned that upwards of 250 mm (9.8 in) of rain could fall in the Tokyo region. In the city of Tokyo, Japanese officials ordered 800 residents to evacuate to shelters due to the threat of Typhoon Kirogi.

Since the storm weakened considerably from its peak intensity, damage was much less than initially anticipated. In all, damages from the storm amounted to ¥54.4 billion (2000 JPY, $505 million USD). Three people were killed by the storm, all of whom were found in irrigation ditches. The first fatality was an 81-year-old man, the second was a 30-year-old man who lost control of his car and crashed into a ditch, and the last fatality was a 3-year-old boy who fell in a ditch near his home. Two 11-year-old boys, initially reported as missing, were later found in a ditch after being swept away by flood waters.

About 1,300 homes were inundated by flood waters around Tokyo and three were destroyed on Kōzushima by a landslide. Widespread power outages took place, leaving an estimated 20,000 people without power in Kanagawa and Shizuoka prefectures as winds up to 177 km/h (110 mph) knocked down trees and power lines. Rainfall from the storm fell at rates of 55 mm/h (2.2 in/h). Total amounts reached 416 mm (16.4 in) in Tokyo, 400 mm (16 in) on Izu Ōshima and 357 mm (14.1 in) in Ogatsu, Miyagi Prefecture. These rains were more than double the monthly average for July in eastern Japan.

Rainfall up to 182 mm (7.2 in) caused flooding throughout eastern Hokkaidō, resulting in widespread agricultural losses. Throughout Aomori Prefecture, large stretches of roads were washed out by flood waters and several thousand homes were inundated. Damage from the storm in Aomori was estimated at ¥777 million (2000 JPY, $7.21 million USD). In Obihiro, Hokkaidō, a total of 2,957 ha (7,310 acres) of agricultural land was inundated by flood waters. The fishing industry in Urakawa District, Hokkaidō sustained severe losses, amounting to ¥899 million (2000 JPY, $8.34 million USD). High winds in the district resulted in moderate roof damage to several homes, some of which lost their roofs.

== See also ==
- Other tropical cyclones named Kirogi
- 2000 Pacific typhoon season
- Typhoon Wipha (2013)
