= List of storms named Kirogi =

The name Kirogi (Korean: 기러기, [kiɾɔɡi]) has been used to name five tropical cyclones in the western North Pacific Ocean. The name was contributed by North Korea and refers to a wild goose in Korean.

- Typhoon Kirogi (2000) (T0003, 05W, Ditang) – a Category 4 typhoon that passed close to Japan while weakening.
- Typhoon Kirogi (2005) (T0520, 11W, Nando) – another Category 4 typhoon that did not threaten land.
- Severe Tropical Storm Kirogi (2012) (T1212, 13W) – remained away from ocean waters.
- Tropical Storm Kirogi (2017) (T1725, 31W, Tino) – minimal tropical storm that affected the Philippines and Vietnam.
- Tropical Storm Kirogi (2023) (T2312, 11W) – not a threat to land.

| Preceded by Tianma | Pacific typhoon season names Kirogi | Succeeded by Yun-yeung |
