= Rikuzen-Akai Station =

Railway station in Higashimatsushima, Miyagi Prefecture, Japan

Rikuzen-Akai Station 陸前赤井駅
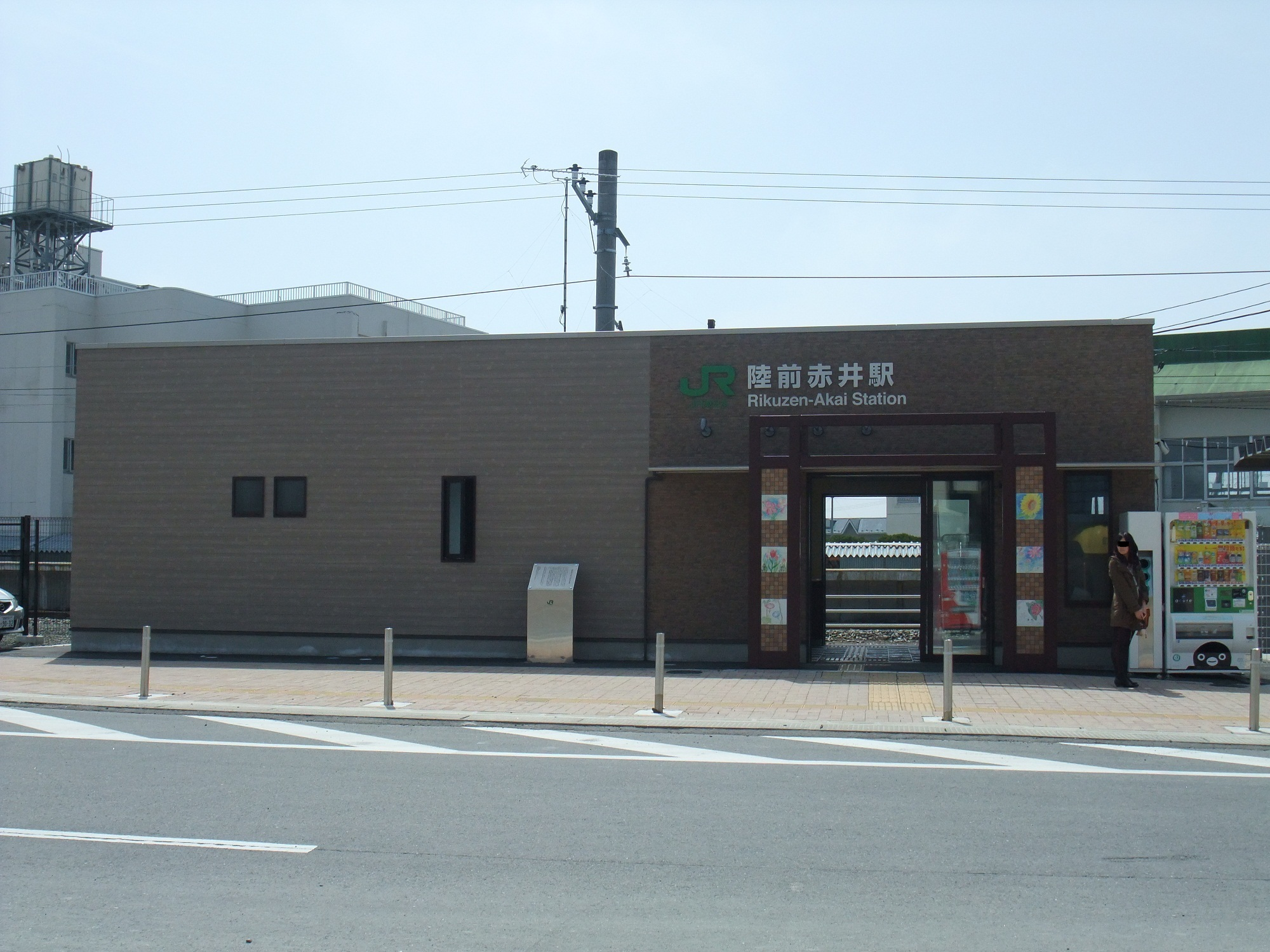
- Rikuzen-Akai Station in April 2012

General information
- Location: Akai Kawamae 1-1, Higashimatsushima-shi, Miyagi-ken 981-0501; Japan
- Coordinates: 38.4325°N 141.2388°E
- Operator: JR East
- Lines: ■ Senseki Line; ■ Senseki-Tōhoku Line
- Distance: 43.1 km from Aoba-dōri
- Platforms: 1 island platform
- Tracks: 2

Other information
- Website: Official website

History
- Opened: November 22, 1928
- Rebuilt: 2012

Passengers
- FY2018: 629

Services
Preceding station	JR East	Following station
Yamoto towards Sendai	Senseki-Tōhoku Line Rapid	Ishinomakiayumino towards Onagawa
Yamoto towards Sendai	Senseki-Tōhoku Line Rapid	Hebita towards Ishinomaki
Yamoto towards Sendai	Senseki-Tōhoku Line Rapid	Ishinomakiayumino One-way operation
Higashi-Yamoto towards Aoba-dori	Senseki Line	Ishinomakiayumino towards Ishinomaki
Location
- Location within Miyagi Prefecture Location within Japan

Rikuzen-Akai Station (陸前赤井駅, Rikuzen-Akai-eki) is a railway station in the city of Higashimatsushima, Miyagi Prefecture, Japan, operated by East Japan Railway Company (JR East).

== Lines ==
Rikuzen-Akai Station is served by the Senseki Line and is located 43.1 kilometers from the starting point of the Senseki Line at Aoba-dōri Station. It is also served by trains of the Senseki-Tōhoku Line.

== Station layout ==
The station has one island platform connected to the station building by a level crossing. The station is staffed.

=== Platforms ===
1	■ Senseki Line	for Matsushima-Kaigan and Aoba-dōri
	■ Senseki-Tōhoku Line	for Shiogama and Sendai
2	■ Senseki Line	for Ishinomaki
	■ Senseki-Tōhoku Line	for Ishinomaki

== History ==
Rikuzen-Akai Station opened on November 22, 1928, as a station on the Miyagi Electric Railway. The Miyagi Electric Railway was nationalized on May 1, 1944. The station was absorbed into the JR East network upon the privatization of JNR on April 1, 1987. The station was closed from March 11, 2011 due to damage to the line associated with the 2011 Tōhoku earthquake and tsunami. Services were restored to Yamoto and Ishinomaki on July 16, 2011. A new station building was completed in February 2012.

== Passenger statistics ==
In fiscal 2018, the station was used by an average of 629 passengers daily (boarding passengers only).

== Surrounding area ==
- National Route 45
- Senseki Hospital
- Miyagi-Akai Post Office

== See also ==
- List of railway stations in Japan
