= Okawa Elementary School =

School destroyed in 2011 Japan tsunami

Coordinates: 38.5463°N 141.4285°E

Okawa Elementary School (Japanese: 大川小学校, Hepburn: Ōkawa Shōgakkō) was an educational institution in Ishinomaki City, Miyagi Prefecture, Japan. The school was destroyed in the 2011 Tōhoku earthquake and tsunami. 74 of its 108 students, who had remained at the school on the instructions of their teachers rather than evacuating to higher ground, were killed as the tsunami ran up the nearby Kitakami River. Only four of the students present when the tsunami struck the school survived. Ten of the school's eleven teachers also died. It was found that the school was unprepared for such an event, and that the scale of the tsunami had not been realized until it was too late.

In 2014, the families of 23 of the children who died sued Ishinomaki City and Miyagi Prefecture for compensation. In October 2016, they were awarded compensation of ¥1.4 billion (US$12.8 million). The school was formally closed in 2018.

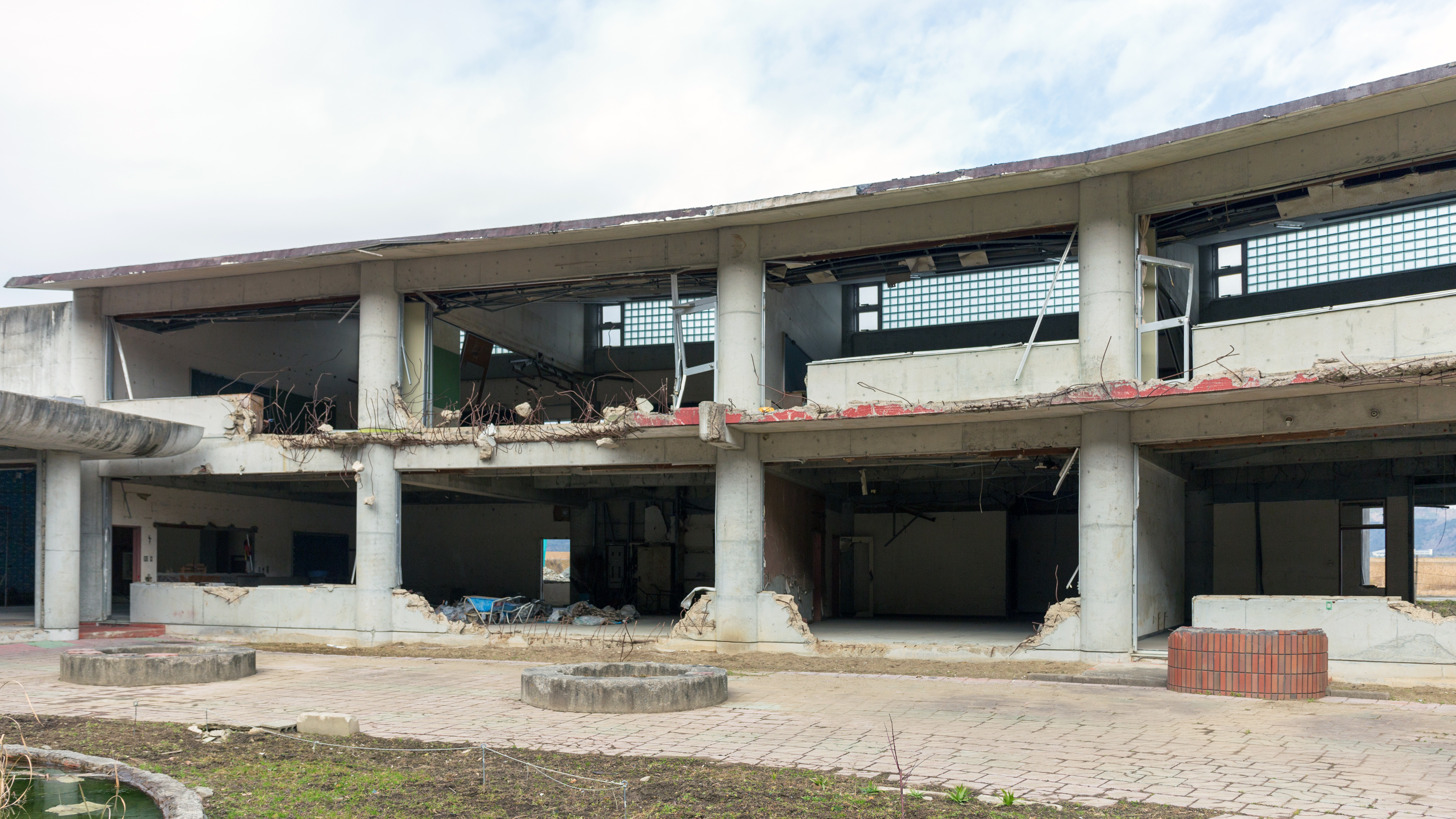
The ruins of the school in 2017

== 2011 Tōhoku earthquake and tsunami ==
=== Debate over evacuation strategy ===
After the earthquake struck, the school sustained substantial damage, with most of its windows shattered and the entire building was at risk of collapse from aftershocks. Teachers gathered the students in the schoolyard and discussed where to evacuate. A hill behind the school was considered a viable option for evacuation; however, due to concerns of possible landslides and falling trees and rocks, it was decided that this was not the best option.

The school faculty was divided between opinions on whether the school should evacuate and take refuge on higher ground or if they should stay in the school grounds. The school was a designated evacuation site for the region, and several elderly residents from the region had evacuated to the school. One side argued that the elderly individuals who had come to the school would not be able to evacuate up onto the hill. This resulted in one suggestion that, rather than evacuating to the closest hill as done previously in drills, they could instead evacuate to the base of the Shin-Kitakami Ohashi Bridge of National Route 398 approximately 200 meters to the west as that was somewhat higher ground than the local weirs.

At the time, there was a 45-passenger school bus parked out front of the school, however, the bus driver (who later died in the event) refused to put the students on the bus and evacuate them without orders from the school, as testified by a driver colleague who spoke to them on the radio in the bus.

Twenty students’ parents arrived at the school to pick up their children and left after signing their children out. Some parents reported to the school staff that the tsunami was expected to hit soon. The teachers convinced some of the parents who arrived to pick up their children to stay at the school with their children, arguing that remaining at the school was safer. One such mother sent her husband an e-mail at 15:29 JST that read, “I am at the school with our child”; both she and the child later died during the tsunami.

Some of the parents who had come to pick up their children saw other children being forcibly returned to the school after attempting to escape to higher ground, with several of the children crying and asking the teachers to let them evacuate up the hill as there were cracks from the earthquake appearing and they believed they would die if they stayed.

It was more than 40 minutes after the earthquake occurred that it was finally decided they would evacuate to higher ground on National Route 398 and they set out on foot. By this point, the emergency radio station was giving orders not to approach the seafront or rivers as water was already flowing up from the city's sewer system and had begun overflowing the weirs.

=== The tsunami strike ===
Immediately after the group left the school grounds and entered the prefectural road out front, a wave of water that had broken over the weirs began engulfing the children from the front. A teacher and several students who were at the rear of the line turned back and ran towards the hill behind the school. Some of those who did so survived, but other students had been so frightened by the sight of the tsunami that they fell to the ground and were unable to flee. Two other students who had not joined the group also survived, though it is unknown why they were separated.

The location towards which the group had been heading was a few meters lower than the tsunami and was completely engulfed by it. Unbeknownst to the group, the tsunami height warnings had been raised from 6 meters to 10 meters at 15:14 JST. The elevation of the point they were evacuating to was from 6 to 7 meters.

== After the tsunami ==
After the tsunami, the school merged with Futamata Elementary School due to decreased number of students.

== The school ruins and memorial hall ==
Okawa Elementary School in 2026 - Grounds with Tsunami Memorial Hall left and main school building right. The students and staff eventually tried to evacuate in this direction. The tsunami came in from the front and right side and smashed against a mountain behind which created a torrent making things worse.

The Ishinomaki City Okawa Elementary School Ruins is a memorial and educational site preserving the school and memorializing those who were lost in the disaster. It opened to the public on 18 July 2021. The site includes the ruined school building, pool area, gymnasium site, and outdoor stage, which visitors can view from outside protective fences. Explanatory panels, a commemorative monument, and an altar for flower offerings accompany the ruins. The adjacent Okawa Tsunami Memorial Hall displays photographs showing the area before and after the disaster, a diorama, and other exhibits.

== Gallery ==
Okawa Elementary School in 2026 - Classroom Interior

Okawa Elementary School in 2026 - Flower offerings

Okawa Elementary School in 2026 - Collapsed Walkway cased by Tsunami
