= Oshika Peninsula =

- Peninsula
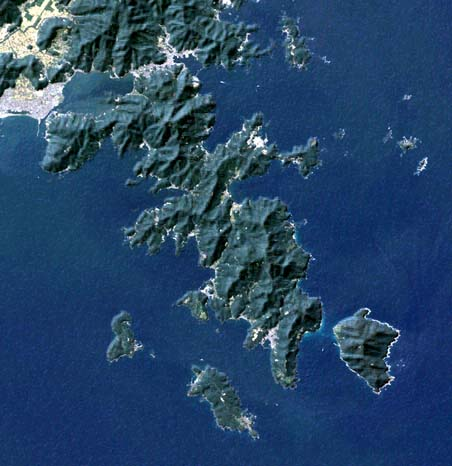
- Landsat image

- Coordinates: 38°16′17″N 141°31′25″E
- Country: Japan
- Region: Miyagi Prefecture

The Oshika Peninsula (牡鹿半島, Oshika-hantō) also pronounced "Ojika" is a peninsula which projects southeast into the Pacific Ocean from the coast of Miyagi Prefecture in northeast Honshu, the main island of Japan.

The peninsula is most often visited as the gateway to the island of Kinkasan, which can be accessed by ferries running from the coastal whaling port of Ayukawa in Ishinomaki, Miyagi, and from Onagawa.

== 2011 earthquake and tsunami ==
The Oshika Peninsula was the closest part of Honshu to the epicenter of the 2011 Tōhoku earthquake, the closest parts of its eastern coastline approximately 72 kilometers (45 mi) away, with only a few neighboring minor islands a few kilometers closer. A report on March 14 indicated that 1,000 bodies had washed ashore on the peninsula. The March 11 earthquake shifted Oshika Peninsula by 5.3 m (17 ft) towards the epicenter and lowered it by 1.2 m (3.9 ft), according to the Geospatial Information Authority in Tsukuba. These two land mass movements are records for Japan, according to government figures. Many small hamlets along the coast of the peninsula, administered by Ishinomaki City, were heavily damaged.

=== Yoriisohama ===
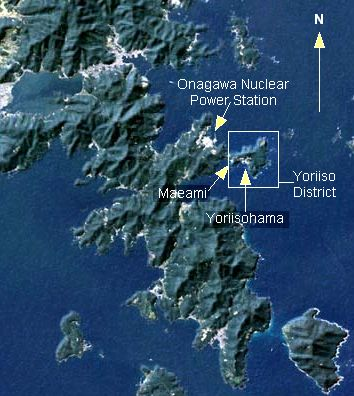
Location of Yoriisohama on the Oshika Peninsula

One of the hamlets affected by the tsunami was Yoriisohama (寄磯浜) located about 1 km east of the Onagawa Nuclear Power Plant, on a headland comprising cliffs and small fjord-like bays on the eastern side of the Oshika Peninsula. The main settlement is in a south-facing bay on the southern slope of Azumamori Mountain (東森山, Azumamoriyama), (153m high). Yoriiso was founded in the 14th century. Local legend has it that its name arose from a rock which was washed onto the beach and which was venerated by the villagers. (寄る 磯 (yoru iso) = "the seashore rocks approach"). Formerly part of the town of Oshika, the hamlet became part of Ishinomaki. In April 2005. As of 2005 Yoriisohama consisted of about 100 households, with a population of about 500, mainly engaged in fishery and related occupations. Historically, Yoriiso included the hamlet of Maeami (前網) 500 metres to the west (population 100 / 25 households).

Yoriisohama was largely destroyed by the 2011 Tōhoku earthquake and tsunami. After their homes were destroyed by a 15 metre high wave, twelve inhabitants died. 150 residents took refuge in the local school which served as an evacuation centre. However, due to its location on a steep slope at the northern tip of the Samenoura bay, it was less severely damaged compared to other settlements in the bay.

== See also ==
- Oshika District, Miyagi
- Onagawa Nuclear Power Plant
