= Rikuzen-Yamashita Station =

Railway station in Ishinomaki, Miyagi Prefecture, Japan

Rikuzen-Yamashita Station 陸前山下駅
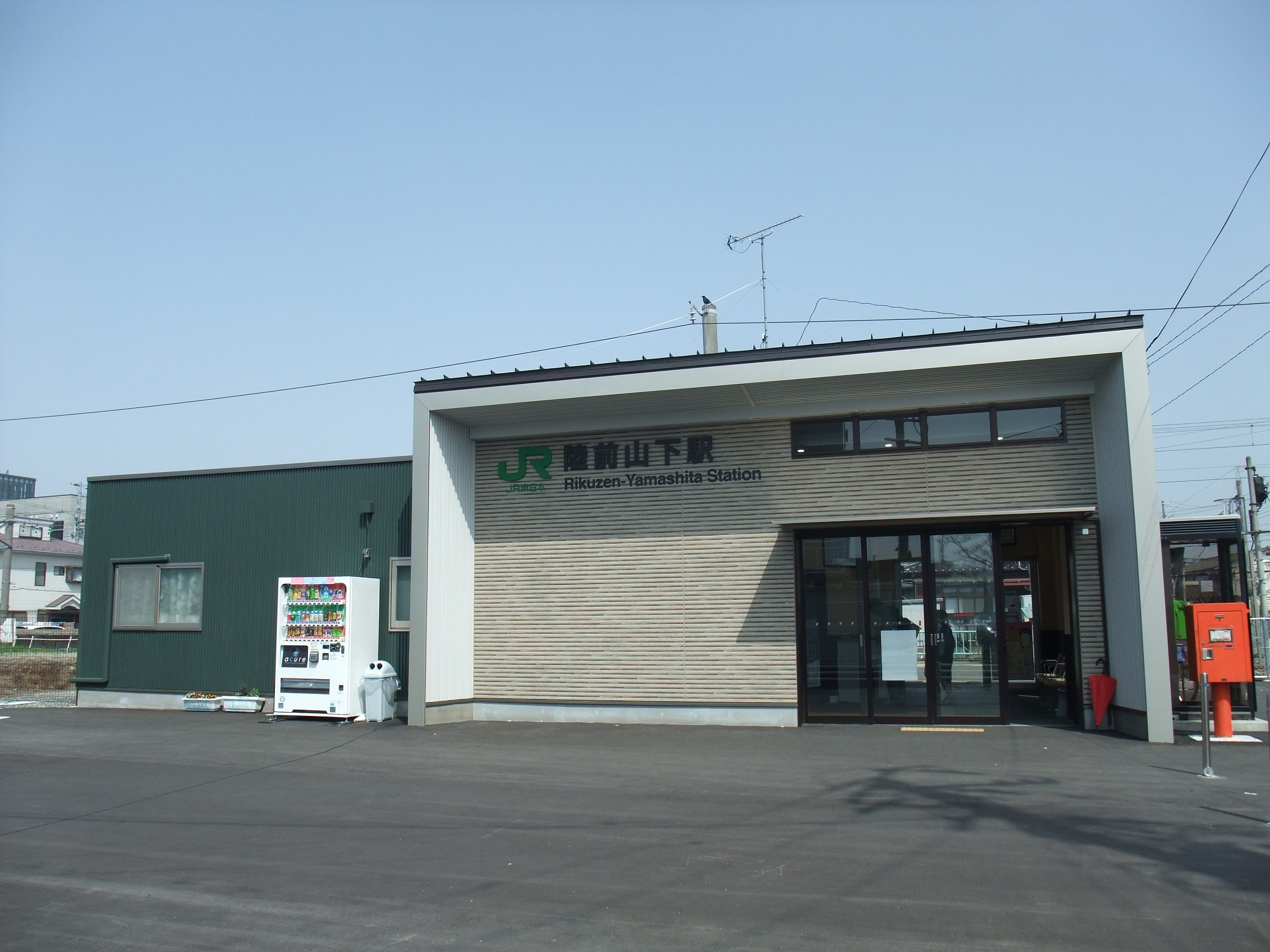
- Rikuzen-Yamashita Station in April 2012

General information
- Location: 6-42 Kichō, Ishinomaki-shi, Miyagi-ken 986-0877; Japan
- Coordinates: 38.4377°N 141.2887°E
- Operator: JR East
- Line: ■ Senseki Line
- Distance: 47.6 km from Aoba-dōri
- Platforms: 1 island platform
- Tracks: 2

Other information
- Status: Staffed
- Website: Official website

History
- Opened: February 1, 1939
- Rebuilt: 2012
- Former names: Miyaden-Yamashita Station (until 1944)

Passengers
- FY2018: 944 daily

Services
Preceding station	JR East	Following station
Hebita towards Sendai	Senseki-Tōhoku Line Rapid	Ishinomaki towards Onagawa
Hebita towards Sendai	Senseki-Tōhoku Line Rapid	Ishinomaki Terminus
Hebita towards Aoba-dori	Senseki Line	Ishinomaki Terminus
Location
- Location within Miyagi Prefecture Location within Japan

Rikuzen-Yamashita Station (陸前山下駅, Rikuzen-Yamashita-eki) is a railway station in the city of Ishinomaki, Miyagi, Japan, operated by the East Japan Railway Company (JR East).

== Lines ==
Rikuzen-Yamashita Station is served by the Senseki Line (including the Senseki-Tōhoku Line). It is 47.6 km from the terminus of the line at Aoba-dōri.

== Station layout ==
The station has one island platform connected to the station building by a level crossing. The station is staffed.

=== Platforms ===
1	■ Senseki Line	for Matsushima-Kaigan and Sendai
	■ Senseki-Tōhoku Line	for Sendai
2	■ Senseki Line	for Ishinomaki
	■ Senseki-Tōhoku Line	for Sendai

== History ==
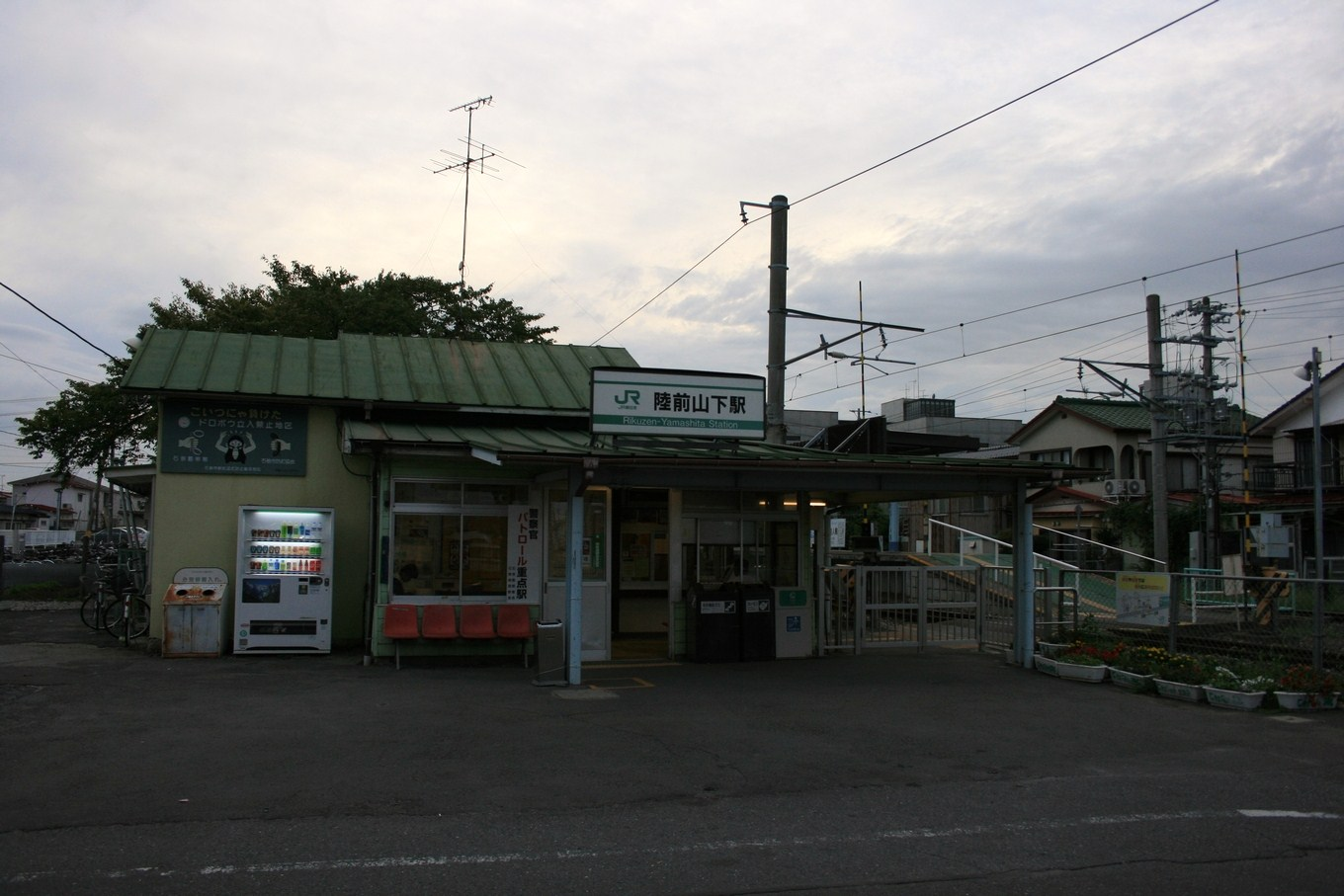
The old station building in September 2007

The station opened on February 1, 1939 as Miyaden-Yamashita Station (宮電山下駅). It was renamed Rikuzen-Yamashita Station on May 1, 1944.

The station building was destroyed in the 2011 Tōhoku earthquake and tsunami on 11 March 2011. A new station building was opened on 3 March 2012.

== Passenger statistics ==
In fiscal 2018, the station was used by an average of 944 passengers daily (boarding passengers only).

== Surrounding area ==
- National Route 45
- National Route 108
- Ishinomaki Police Station
- Ishinomaki Technical High School
- Ishinomaki Kobunkan High School
- Ishinomaki Yamashita Junior High School

== See also ==
- List of railway stations in Japan
