= Ishinomaki =

Ishinomaki 石巻市
- City
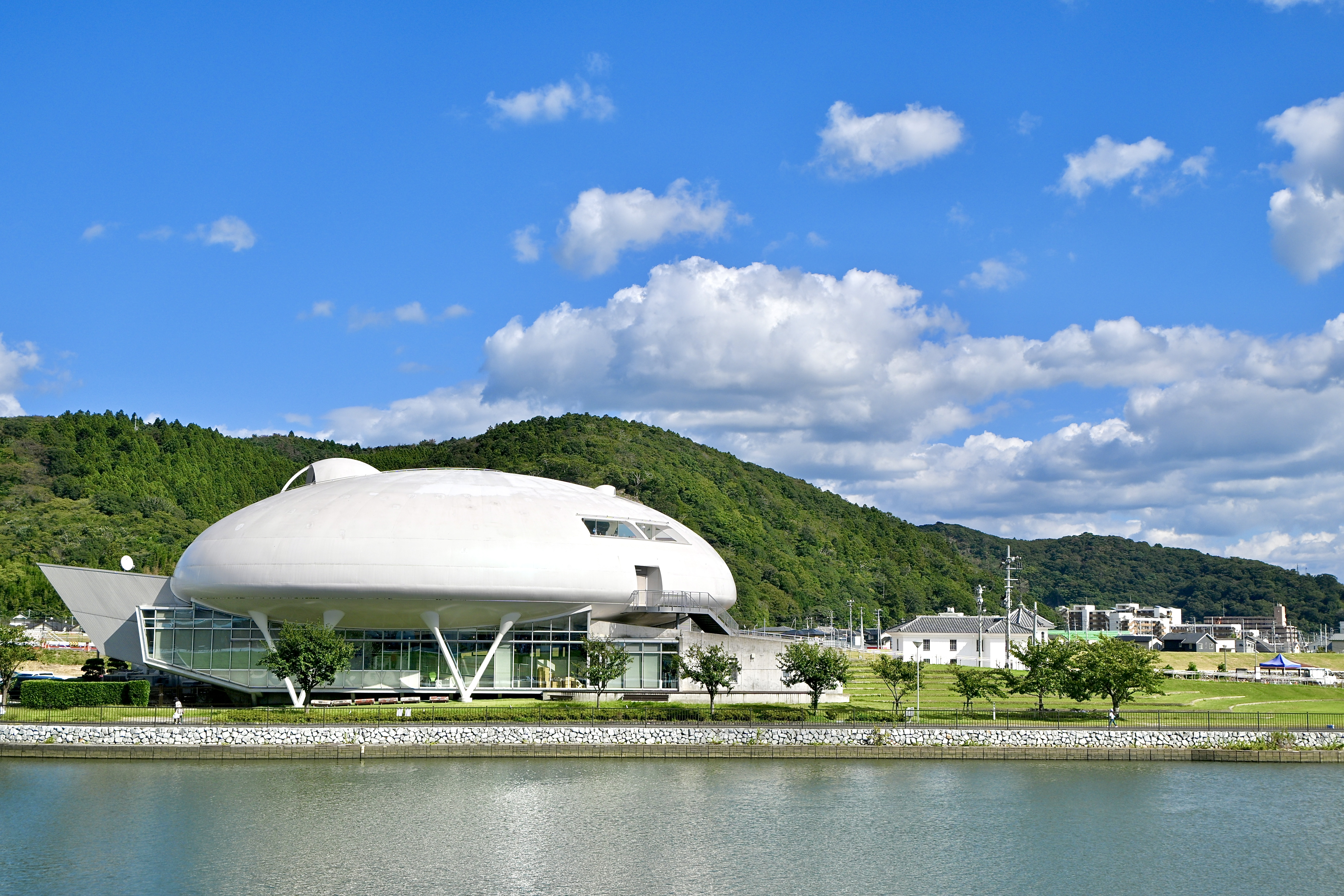

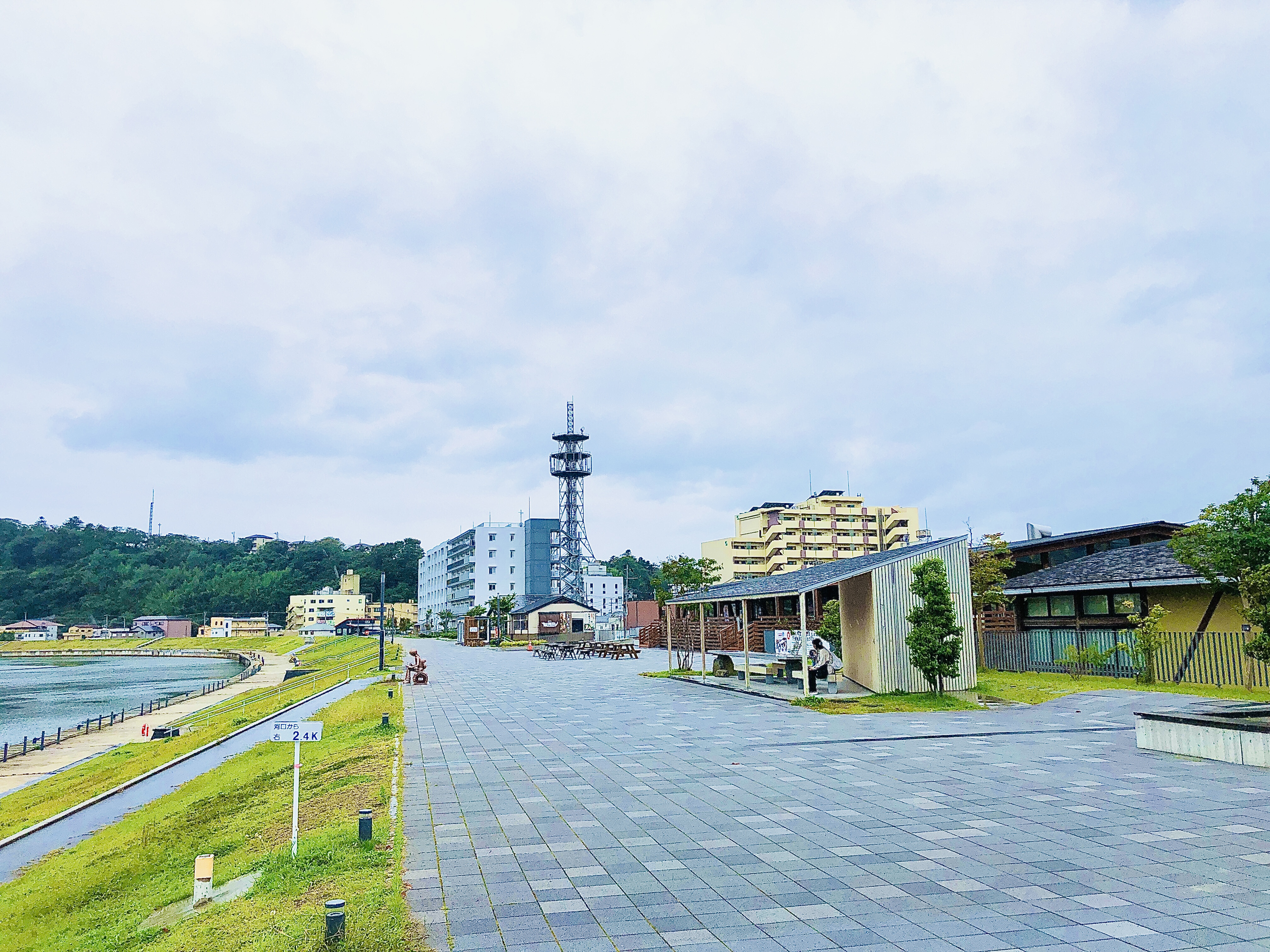

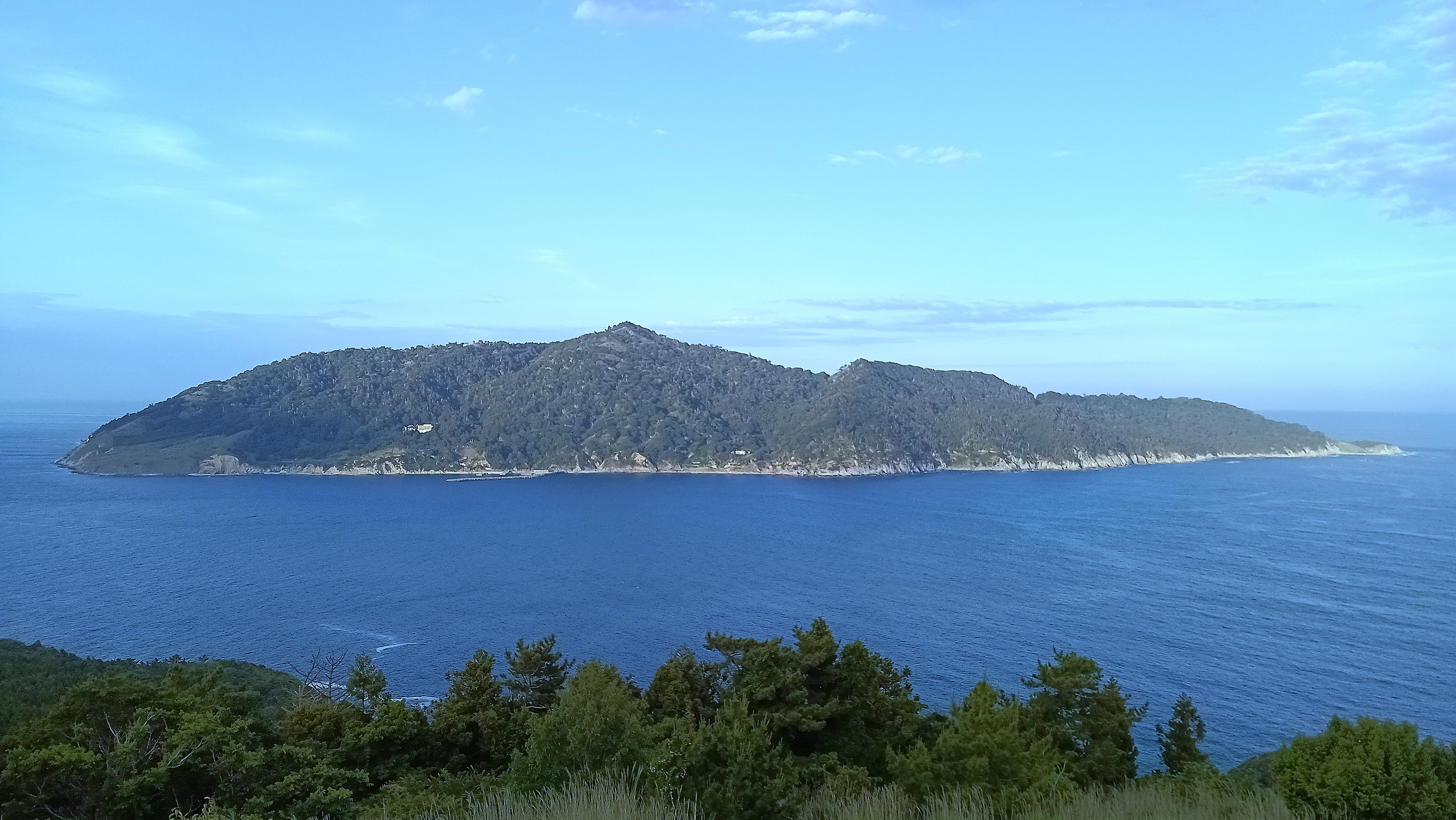

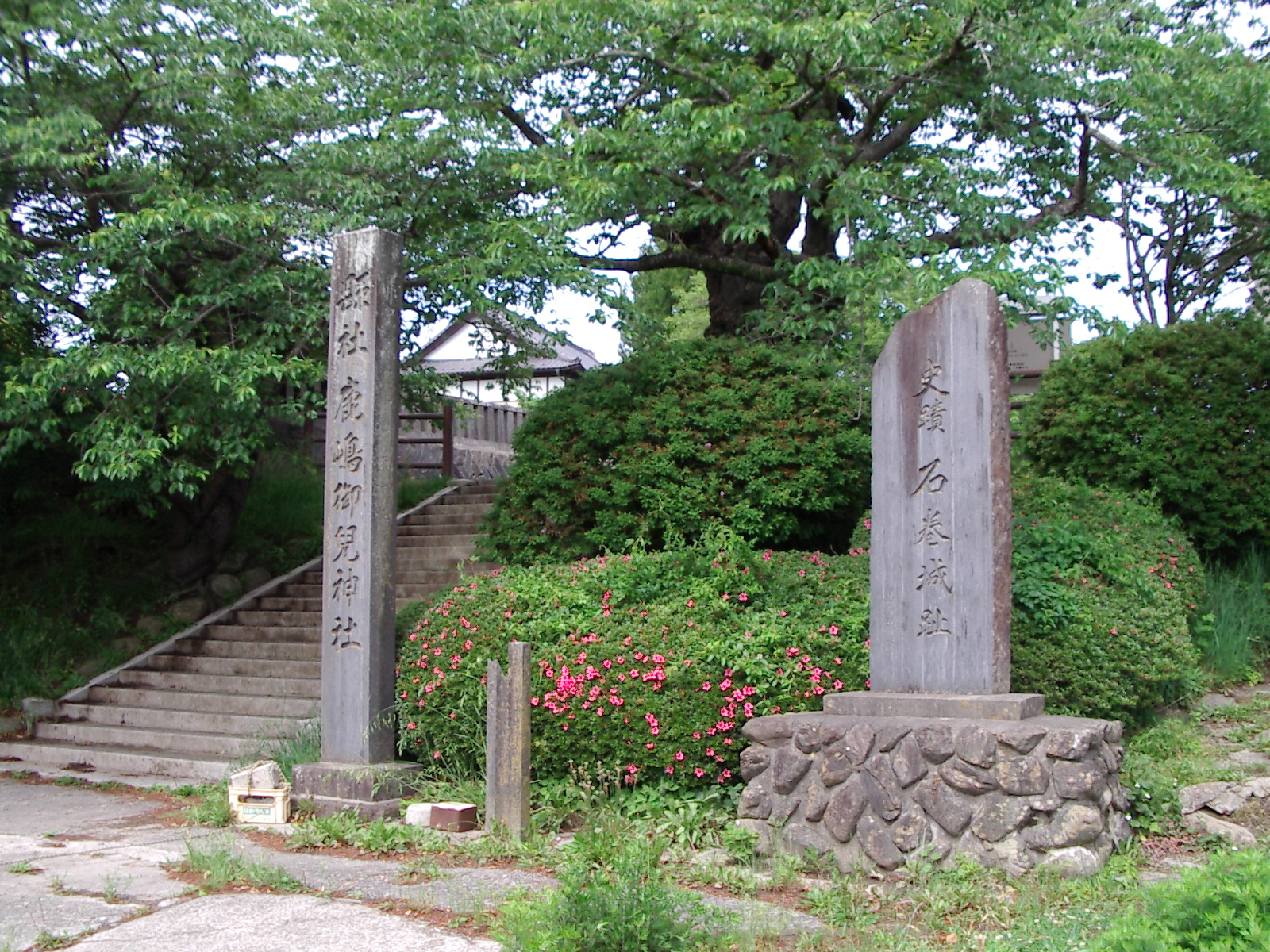

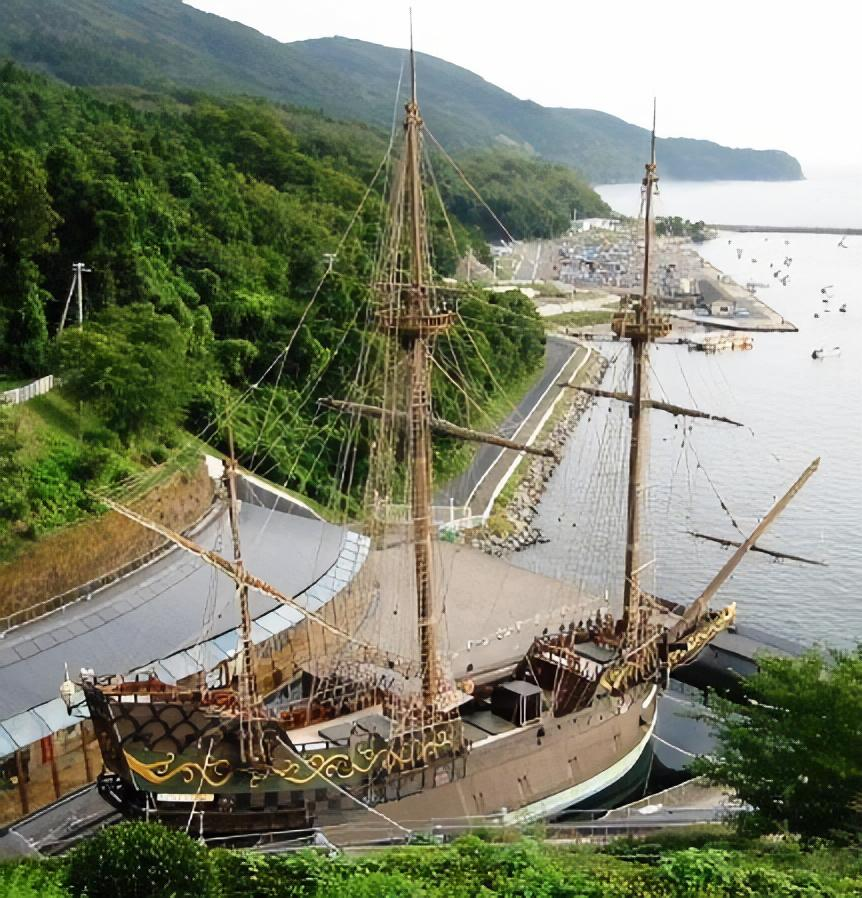
Mangattan museum
Kawamachi Open Park	Mount Kinka from Oshika Peninsula
Hiyoriyama park	San Juan Bautista
- Flag Seal

- Location of Ishinomaki in Miyagi Prefecture

- Coordinates: 38°25′3.3″N 141°18′9.8″E
- Country: Japan
- Region: Tōhoku
- Prefecture: Miyagi
- First official recorded: 367 AD
- City Settled: April 1. 1933

Government
  - Mayor: Masami Saito

Area
  - Total: 554.55 km^{2} (214.11 sq mi)

Population (May 30, 2025)
  - Total: 131,189
  - Density: 236.57/km^{2} (612.71/sq mi)
- Time zone: UTC+09:00 (Japan Standard Time)
- Phone number: 0225-95-1111
- Address: 14-1 Kokucho, Ishinomaki-shi, Miyagi-ken 986-8501
- Climate: Cfa
- Website: Official website
- Symbols
- Flower: Azalea
- Tree: Japanese Black Pine

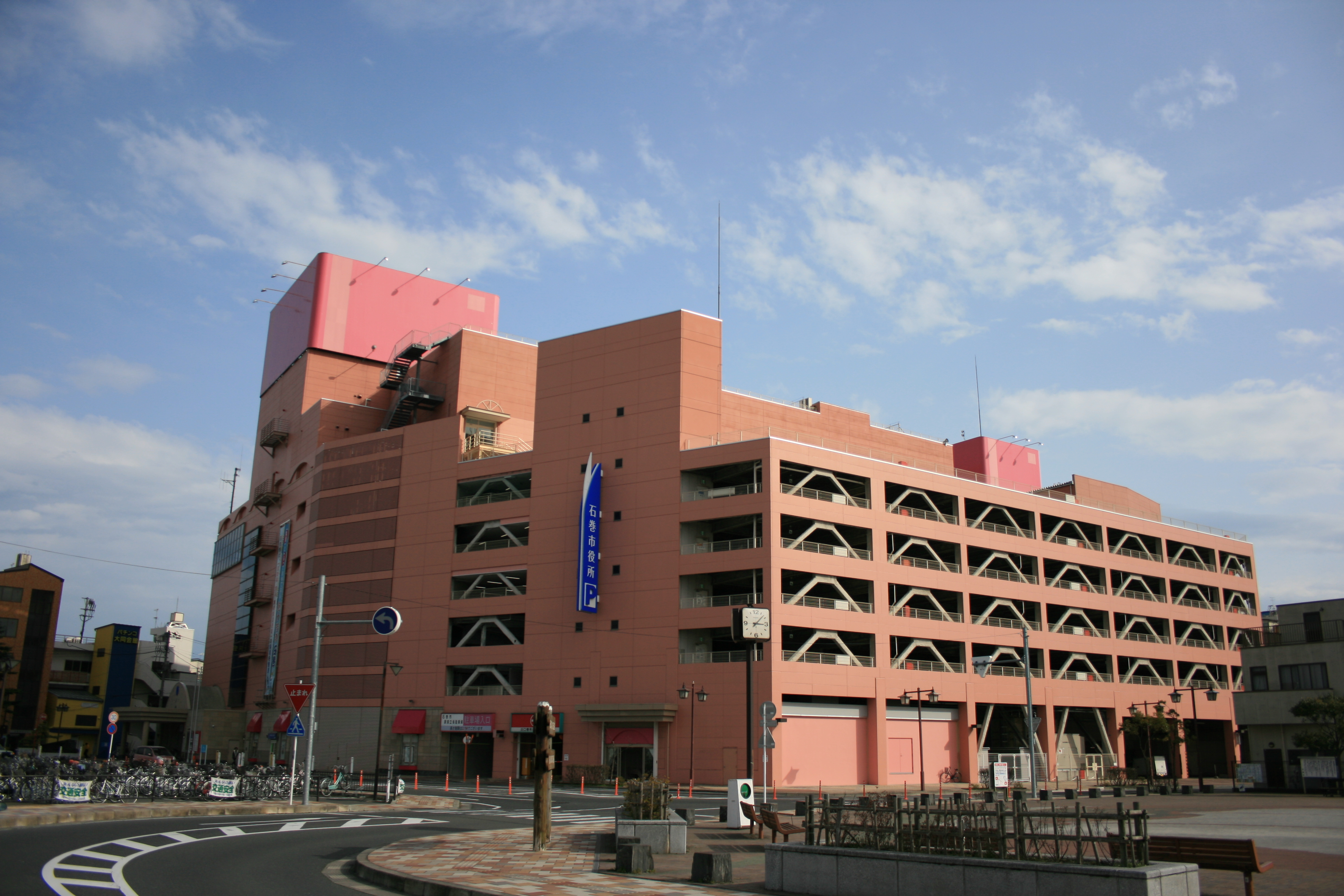
Ishinomaki City Hall

Ishinomaki (石巻市, Ishinomaki-shi; Japanese pronunciation: [ì.ɕí.nó̞.mä̀.k̟ʲì, -mä́.k̟ʲi̥.ɕì]) is a city located in Miyagi Prefecture, Japan. As of 30 May 2025, the city has an estimated population of 131,189, and a population density of 250 persons per km^{2} in 62,546 households. The total area of the city is 554.55 square kilometres (214.11 sq mi).

== Geography ==
Ishinomaki is in northeastern Miyagi Prefecture. The city borders on Ishinomaki Bay to the south and Minamisanriku city to the north, with the Kitakami Mountains to the west. Its coastline forms part of the Sanriku Fukkō National Park, which stretches north to Aomori Prefecture. Ishinomaki includes Tashirojima (also known as "Cat Island"), Ajishima, and Kinkasan, three islands off the south coast of Oshika Peninsula.

=== Neighboring municipalities ===
Miyagi Prefecture

- Higashimatsushima
- Minamisanriku
- Misato
- Onagawa
- Tome
- Wakuya

=== Climate ===
Ishinomaki has a humid subtropical climate (Köppen climate classification Cfa) characterized by mild summers and cold winters. The average annual temperature in Ishinomaki is 11.9 °C (53.4 °F). The average annual rainfall is 1,091.3 mm (42.96 in) with September as the wettest month. The temperatures are highest on average in August, at around 23.6 °C (74.5 °F), and lowest in January, at around 1.0 °C (33.8 °F). Its record high is 36.8 °C (98.2 °F), reached on 15 August 2007, and its record low is −14.6 °C (5.7 °F), reached on 6 January 1919.

Climate data for Ishinomaki (elevation 42.5 m, 1991–2020 normals, extremes 1887–present)
Month	Jan	Feb	Mar	Apr	May	Jun	Jul	Aug	Sep	Oct	Nov	Dec	Year
Record high °C (°F)	15.2 (59.4)	19.2 (66.6)	20.7 (69.3)	28.4 (83.1)	30.7 (87.3)	34.7 (94.5)	35.8 (96.4)	36.8 (98.2)	34.0 (93.2)	28.5 (83.3)	23.7 (74.7)	21.9 (71.4)	36.8 (98.2)
Mean maximum °C (°F)	10.4 (50.7)	12.0 (53.6)	16.2 (61.2)	21.8 (71.2)	25.7 (78.3)	28.1 (82.6)	31.7 (89.1)	32.8 (91.0)	30.0 (86.0)	24.8 (76.6)	19.2 (66.6)	12.9 (55.2)	33.2 (91.8)
Mean daily maximum °C (°F)	4.8 (40.6)	5.6 (42.1)	8.9 (48.0)	14.1 (57.4)	18.7 (65.7)	21.9 (71.4)	25.2 (77.4)	27.0 (80.6)	24.2 (75.6)	19.1 (66.4)	13.2 (55.8)	7.3 (45.1)	15.9 (60.6)
Daily mean °C (°F)	1.0 (33.8)	1.6 (34.9)	4.6 (40.3)	9.6 (49.3)	14.5 (58.1)	18.3 (64.9)	21.9 (71.4)	23.6 (74.5)	20.5 (68.9)	15.0 (59.0)	8.9 (48.0)	3.4 (38.1)	11.9 (53.4)
Mean daily minimum °C (°F)	−2.2 (28.0)	−2.0 (28.4)	0.5 (32.9)	5.4 (41.7)	11.0 (51.8)	15.5 (59.9)	19.5 (67.1)	21.1 (70.0)	17.4 (63.3)	10.9 (51.6)	4.6 (40.3)	0.0 (32.0)	8.5 (47.3)
Mean minimum °C (°F)	−6.4 (20.5)	−5.9 (21.4)	−3.9 (25.0)	−0.1 (31.8)	5.8 (42.4)	10.9 (51.6)	15.4 (59.7)	16.7 (62.1)	11.1 (52.0)	4.5 (40.1)	−1.2 (29.8)	−4.2 (24.4)	−7.0 (19.4)
Record low °C (°F)	−14.6 (5.7)	−13.1 (8.4)	−10.3 (13.5)	−5.0 (23.0)	−0.1 (31.8)	5.7 (42.3)	8.3 (46.9)	11.5 (52.7)	6.2 (43.2)	−0.7 (30.7)	−4.6 (23.7)	−10.5 (13.1)	−14.6 (5.7)
Average precipitation mm (inches)	38.8 (1.53)	31.0 (1.22)	72.4 (2.85)	86.1 (3.39)	96.8 (3.81)	110.6 (4.35)	145.7 (5.74)	115.8 (4.56)	151.6 (5.97)	137.9 (5.43)	61.9 (2.44)	42.8 (1.69)	1,091.3 (42.96)
Average snowfall cm (inches)	17 (6.7)	16 (6.3)	9 (3.5)	1 (0.4)	0 (0)	0 (0)	0 (0)	0 (0)	0 (0)	0 (0)	1 (0.4)	8 (3.1)	51 (20)
Average precipitation days (≥ 0.5 mm)	6.5	6.5	8.7	9.8	10.1	10.9	13.7	10.7	11.4	9.8	7.5	7.6	113.2
Average snowy days	18.7	14.6	10.5	1.4	0.0	0.0	0.0	0.0	0.0	0.0	1.4	13.8	60.7
Average relative humidity (%)	71	69	67	68	74	80	84	82	80	76	73	73	75
Mean monthly sunshine hours	163.8	164.6	184.5	193.4	196.0	157.4	140.1	161.9	137.3	151.5	150.0	146.2	1,946.7
Source: Japan Meteorological Agency (1991–2020 normals, extremes 1887–present)

Climate data for Monou, Ishinomaki (elevation 5 m, 2011−2020 normals, extremes 2011−present)
Month	Jan	Feb	Mar	Apr	May	Jun	Jul	Aug	Sep	Oct	Nov	Dec	Year
Record high °C (°F)	11.9 (53.4)	17.8 (64.0)	23.4 (74.1)	29.6 (85.3)	32.1 (89.8)	31.9 (89.4)	35.3 (95.5)	37.2 (99.0)	34.1 (93.4)	29.1 (84.4)	22.0 (71.6)	17.7 (63.9)	37.2 (99.0)
Mean daily maximum °C (°F)	4.7 (40.5)	5.7 (42.3)	10.8 (51.4)	15.8 (60.4)	21.4 (70.5)	23.8 (74.8)	27.3 (81.1)	29.2 (84.6)	25.7 (78.3)	19.8 (67.6)	13.4 (56.1)	6.9 (44.4)	17.0 (62.7)
Daily mean °C (°F)	0.3 (32.5)	0.9 (33.6)	4.9 (40.8)	9.8 (49.6)	15.8 (60.4)	19.3 (66.7)	22.9 (73.2)	24.4 (75.9)	20.7 (69.3)	14.4 (57.9)	8.0 (46.4)	2.4 (36.3)	12.0 (53.6)
Mean daily minimum °C (°F)	−4.3 (24.3)	−4.1 (24.6)	−0.8 (30.6)	3.7 (38.7)	11.0 (51.8)	15.6 (60.1)	19.7 (67.5)	21.1 (70.0)	16.7 (62.1)	9.4 (48.9)	2.7 (36.9)	−1.8 (28.8)	7.4 (45.4)
Record low °C (°F)	−15.8 (3.6)	−17.2 (1.0)	−6.6 (20.1)	−3.1 (26.4)	3.9 (39.0)	8.0 (46.4)	13.3 (55.9)	12.9 (55.2)	6.8 (44.2)	0.4 (32.7)	−5.3 (22.5)	−10.6 (12.9)	−17.2 (1.0)
Average precipitation mm (inches)	32.1 (1.26)	25.7 (1.01)	75.1 (2.96)	101.0 (3.98)	88.1 (3.47)	92.9 (3.66)	128.7 (5.07)	114.9 (4.52)	147.8 (5.82)	141.3 (5.56)	48.2 (1.90)	42.7 (1.68)	1,042.9 (41.06)
Average precipitation days (≥ 1.0 mm)	5.1	5.8	6.4	8.7	9.0	8.6	10.4	11.0	10.3	8.3	6.3	6.4	96.3
Source: Japan Meteorological Agency

== Demographics ==
Per Japanese census data, the population of Ishinomaki has declined over the past 40 years.

Historical population
Year	Pop.	±%
1920	102,953	—
1930	122,589	+19.1%
1940	137,327	+12.0%
1950	177,015	+28.9%
1960	180,012	+1.7%
1970	177,597	−1.3%
1980	186,094	+4.8%
1990	182,911	−1.7%
2000	174,778	−4.4%
2010	160,826	−8.0%
2020	140,151	−12.9%

== History ==
The area of present-day Ishinomaki was part of ancient Mutsu Province. During the Sengoku period, the area was contested by various samurai clans before the area came under the control of the Date clan of Sendai Domain during the Edo period. The town prospered as a major port and transshipment center for coastal shipping between Edo and northern Japan. The town of Ishinomaki was established within Oshika District on June 1, 1889, with the establishment of the modern municipalities system.

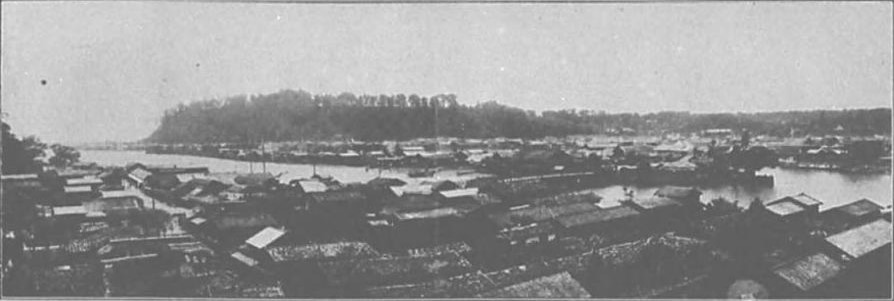
Ishinomaki in the Taishō era

The city was founded on April 1, 1933. On April 1, 2005, Ishinomaki absorbed the neighboring towns of Kahoku, Kanan, Kitakami, Monou and Ogatsu, and the town of Oshika to more than quadruple its area, and add nearly 60,000 people to its population.

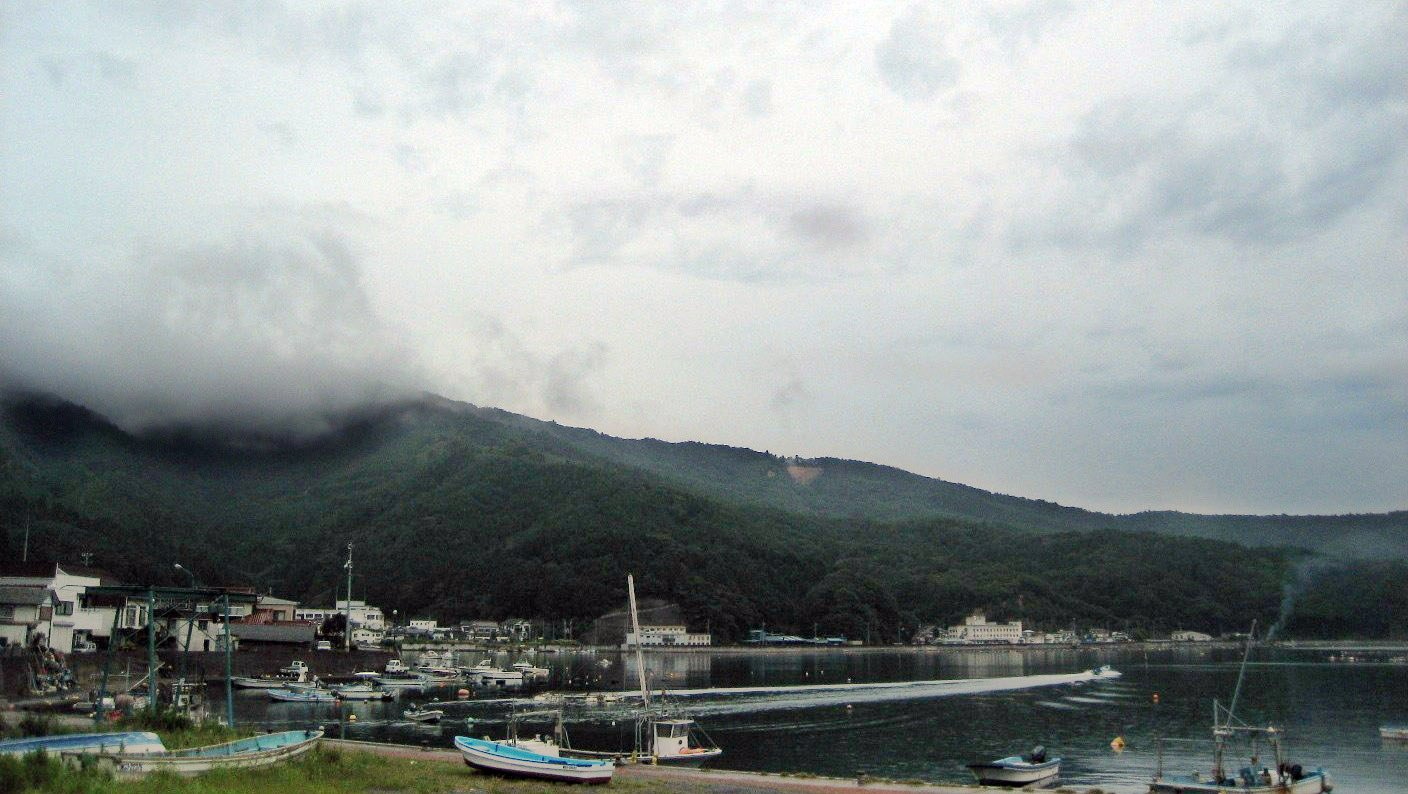
Ogatsu in 2009

The town of Ogatsu is regionally famous for its inkstones and has an annual scallop festival in the summer. Ayukawa, a town in Oshika, was formerly a base for several ships in Japan's whaling fleet.

=== 2011 earthquake, tsunami, and subsidence ===
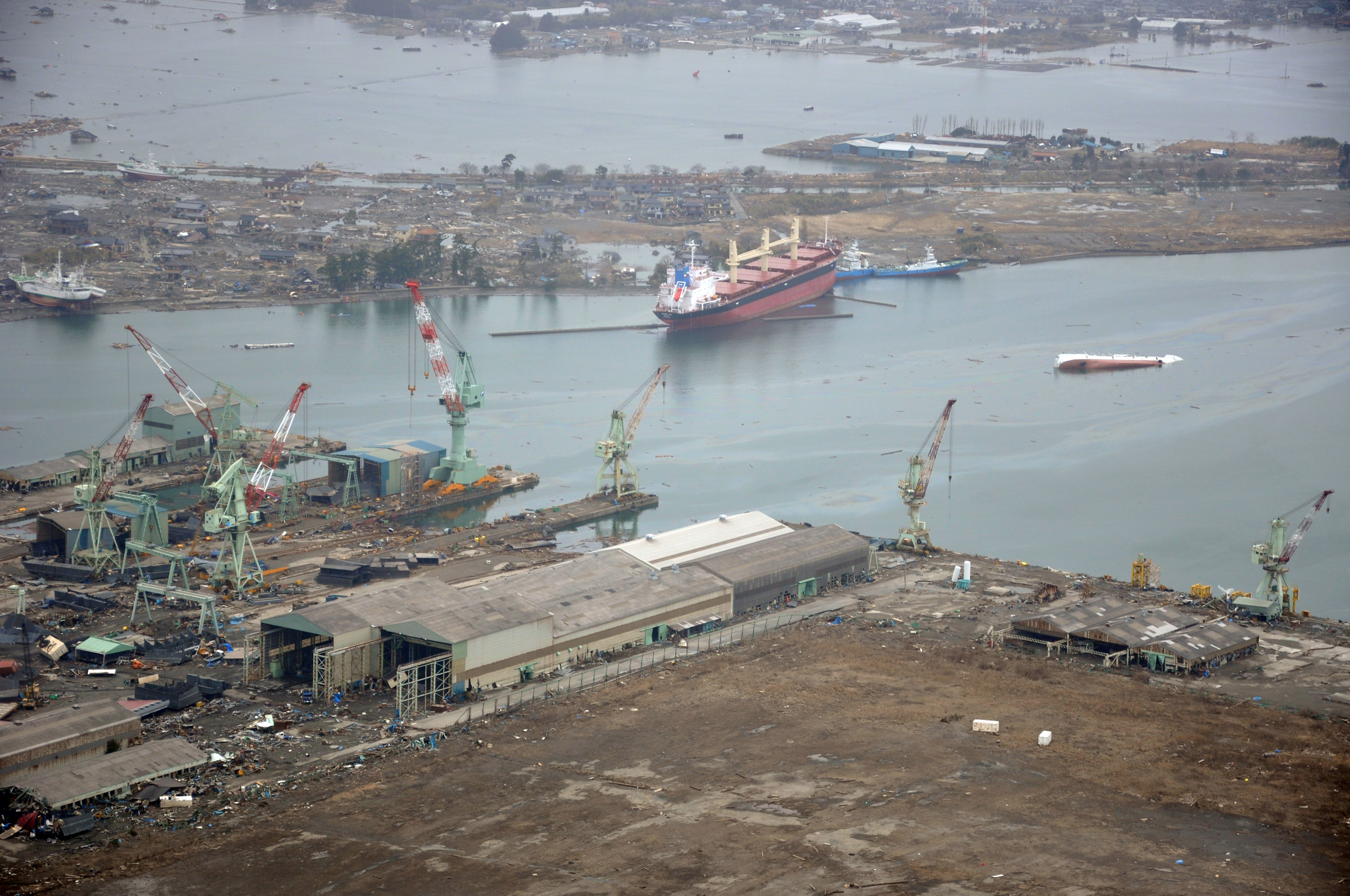
Ishinomaki port on 20 March 2011 showing heavy damage to ships and port facilities caused by the 11 March 2011 tsunami

Municipal Kadonowaki Elementary School

Ishinomaki was among the municipalities most seriously affected by the 2011 Tōhoku earthquake and tsunami. Several tsunamis, up to about 10 metres (33 ft) high, traveled inland up to 5 kilometres (3.1 mi) from the coast. The tsunami destroyed around 80% of the 700 houses in the coastal port of Ayukawa, and the Kadonowaki neighborhood was largely leveled. Approximately 46% of the city was inundated by the tsunami. Following the tsunami, a Kamen Rider statue was found completely intact despite damage to the surrounding area; a writer for Tokyo Sports hoped that it would symbolically give hope to the survivors of the disaster.

Many public schools were completely destroyed, including Ishinomaki Okawa Elementary School, which lost 70 of 108 students and nine of 13 teachers and staff. There is still anger among some of the parents of the dead students because the teachers had wasted precious time in debating whether to evacuate to higher ground. And when the decision was finally made, the teachers had decided to get to higher ground further away from the school which necessitated crossing a nearby river bridge. It was here while crossing the bridge that both the teachers and students were swept away by the tsunami. This decision is deemed unreasonable by many of the parents because there is a hill right behind the school, which they could have reached quickly. One of the teachers had tried to persuade the other teachers to bring the students to safety uphill soon after the earthquake; when he was unsuccessful, he evacuated himself, managing to persuade one of the students to go with him - both survived. One of the teachers who survived the tsunami at the bridge later committed suicide.

Ishinomaki is the Japanese municipality with the highest confirmed death count. As of 17 June 2011, a total of 3,097 deaths had been confirmed in Ishinomaki due to the tsunami, with 2,770 unaccounted for. Approximately 29,000 city residents lost their homes.

Ishinomaki employs several foreigners to teach English in all of its elementary and junior high schools, as well as the two municipal high schools. American teacher Taylor Anderson was killed by the tsunami. Since her death, her family has been active in supporting the Ishinomaki school district, and has set up programs to further English education.

The earthquake shifted the city southeast and downward, lowering it by as much as 1.2 metres (3.9 ft) in some areas and causing it to flood twice daily at high tide. A once sandy beach in the Kadonowaki area completely disappeared and tides reached the wall that once separated the beach from the road. Near the Mangakan Island, a walkway with benches was partially submerged in the river.

=== Rebuilding ===
Since 2011, Ishinomaki and other municipalities have been focusing on rebuilding and attracting residents back into the area. In 2019, eight years after the tragedy, Okawa Elementary School remains in ruins, as a memorial to those that were lost in the tsunami. Numerous parents who lost children due to staff errors sued the school and won in 2016.

Ishinomaki and other neighboring cities started construction on levees and large walls along the coast to protect against future tsunamis.

== Government ==
Ishinomaki has a mayor-council form of government with a directly elected mayor and a unicameral city legislature of 30 members. Ishinomaki, together with the town of Onagawa, contributes five seats to the Miyagi Prefectural legislature. In terms of national politics, the city is part of Miyagi 4th district of the lower house of the Diet of Japan.

== Economy ==
Ishinomaki Mill, Nippon Paper Industries

Ishinomaki traditionally has been a center for commercial fishing, especially for the cultivation of oysters.

== Education ==
- Ishinomaki Senshu University
- Ishinomaki has 36 public elementary schools, 20 public junior high schools and one public high school operated by the city government, and seven public high schools operated by the Miyagi Prefectural Board of Education. The prefectural also operates one special education school for the handicapped. A private university, the Ishinomaki Senshu University, is also located in the city.

== Transportation ==
=== Railway ===
==== JR East ====
- ■Ishinomaki Line
  - Maeyachi - Kakeyama - Kanomata - Sobanokami - Ishinomaki - Rikuzen-Inai - Watanoha - Mangokuura - Sawada
- ■Senseki Line(■■Senseki-Tōhoku Line)
  - Ishinomakiayumino - Hebita - Rikuzen-Yamashita - Ishinomaki
- ■Kesennuma Line
  - Maeyachi - Wabuchi

=== Intercity bus ===
Daily scheduled intercity buses bound for the following cities, through the Sanriku Expressway, are being served from Ishinomaki Station.

- Sendai via Aeon Ishinomaki Shopping Center (Mall), by Miyakou Bus Co. Ltd., a subsidiary of Miyagi Transportation (Miyagi Kotsu) Co., Ltd.
- Shinjuku, Tokyo via Shibuya (overnight): via Sendai, operated by Miyagi Transportation (Miyagi Kotsu) Co., Ltd. and Keio Dentetsu Bus Corporation

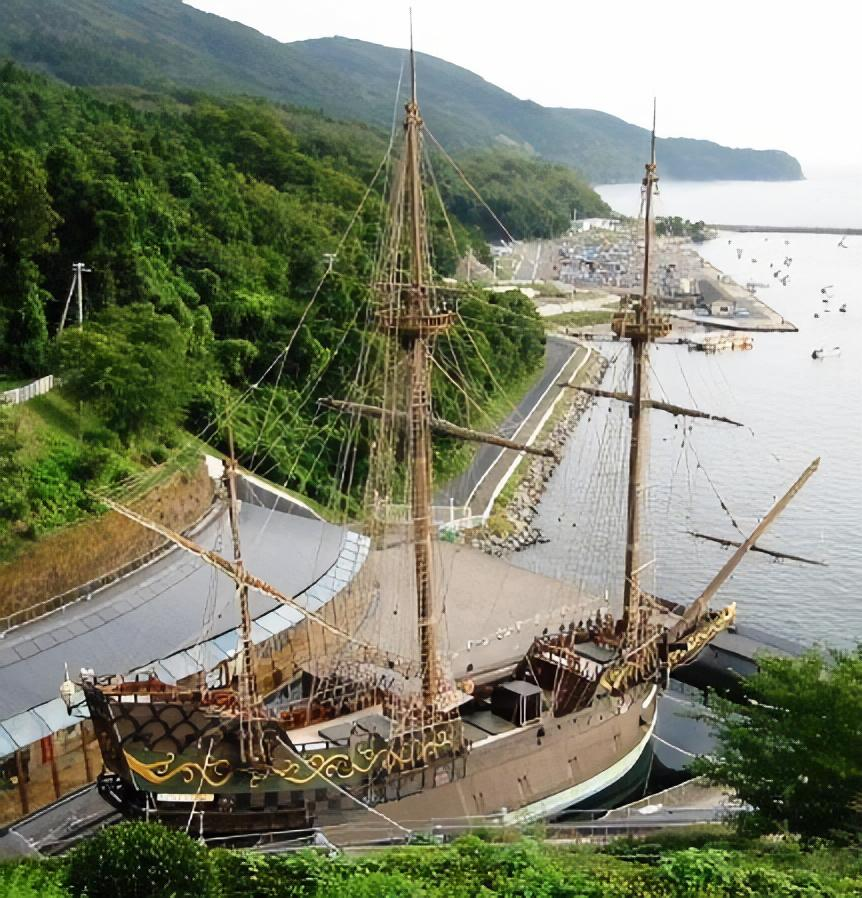
A replica of the Japanese-built galleon San Juan Bautista

=== Highways ===
- Sanriku Expressway (Ishinomaki-kanan, Kahoku, Monou-toyosato and Monou-tsuyama interchanges)
- National Route 45
- National Route 108
- National Route 398

=== Seaport ===
- Port of Ishinomaki

== Local attractions ==
Ishinomaki Manga Museum

- Ishii lock
- Ishinomaki Saint John the Apostle Orthodox Church
- Ishinomori Manga Museum along with Manga Road celebrating Shotaro Ishinomori's manga legacy.
- The reed fields at the mouth of the Kitakami River at Ishinomaki is listed as one of the 100 Soundscapes of Japan by the Ministry of the Environment
- Numazu Shell Midden, a Jōmon period National Historic Site
- Saitō Garden
- San Juan Bautista, replica of a ship commissioned in 1613 by Date Masamune to transport an embassy to the Pope in Rome.

== Sister cities ==
Ishinomaki is twinned with:

- Hitachinaka, Japan

=== Friendship cities ===
- Civitavecchia, Italy
- Hagi, Japan
- Kahoku, Japan
- Wenzhou, China

== Noted people from Ishinomaki ==
- Kasugafuji Akihiro, sumo wrestler
- Jun Azumi, politician
- Tatsuji Fuse, lawyer, social activist
- Sukekiyo Kameyama, voice actor
- Isamu Kosugi, actor, movie director
- Mai Mukaida, make-up artist and businesswoman
- Naoya Shiga, author
- Keiko Suzuka, actress
- Mayo Suzukaze, actress
