= Ishinomakiayumino Station =

Railway station in Ishinomaki, Miyagi Prefecture, Japan

Ishinomakiayumino Station 石巻あゆみ野
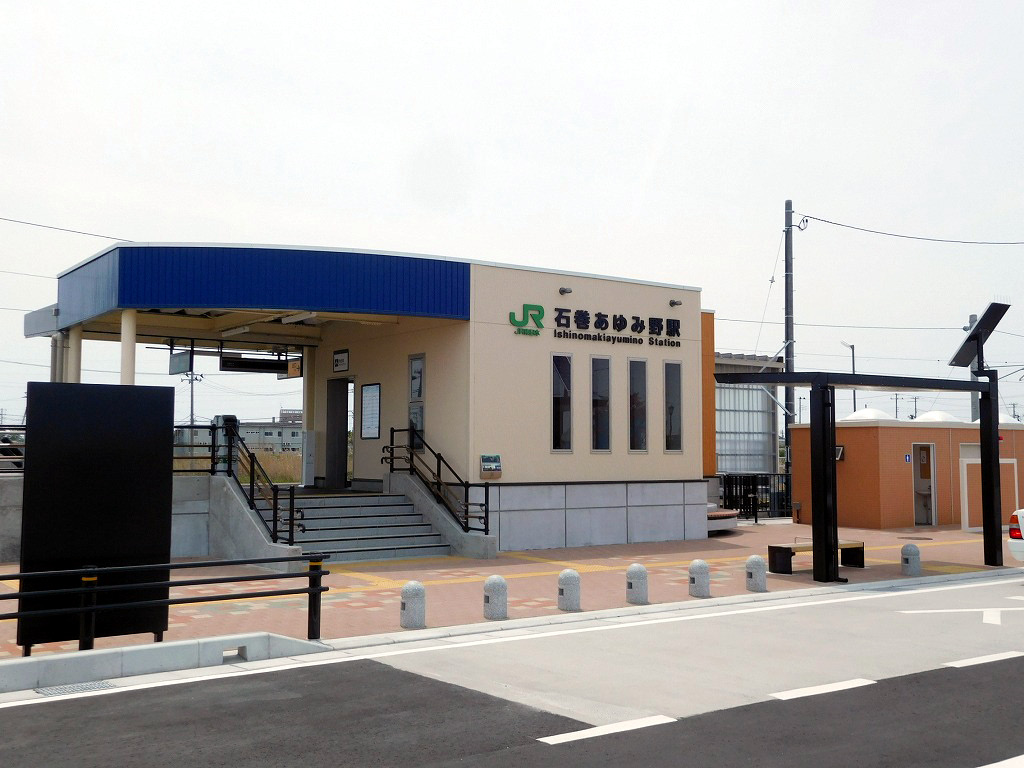
- Ishinomakiayumino Station in May 2016

General information
- Location: Kadonowaki, Ishinomaki-shi, Miyagi-ken 986-0853; Japan
- Coordinates: 38°26′10″N 141°15′34″E
- Operator: JR East
- Line: ■ Senseki Line
- Distance: 45.2 km from Aoba-dōri
- Platforms: 1 side platform
- Tracks: 1

Other information
- Status: Unstaffed
- Website: Official website

History
- Opened: 26 March 2016

Passengers
- 300 daily (forecast)

Services
Preceding station	JR East	Following station
Rikuzen-Akai towards Sendai	Senseki-Tōhoku Line Rapid	Hebita towards Onagawa
Rikuzen-Akai towards Sendai	Senseki-Tōhoku Line Rapid	Hebita One-way operation
Rikuzen-Akai towards Aoba-dori	Senseki Line	Hebita towards Ishinomaki
Location
- Location within Japan

Ishinomakiayumino Station (石巻あゆみ野駅, Ishinomakiayumino-eki) is a railway station on the Senseki Line in the city of Ishinomaki, Miyagi, Japan, operated by East Japan Railway Company (JR East).

== Lines ==
Ishinomakiayumino Station is served by the Senseki Line (including the Senseki-Tōhoku Line). Located between Rikuzen-Akai and Hebita stations, Ishinomakiayumino is 45.2 kilometers from the starting point of the Senseki Line at Aoba-dōri Station.

== Station layout ==
The station has one 85 m (four cars) long side platform serving a single bidirectional track. The station is unstaffed and has no ticket vending machine, but has entry & exit IC card readers and a boarding certificate issuing machine.

There used to be automatic ticket vending machines.

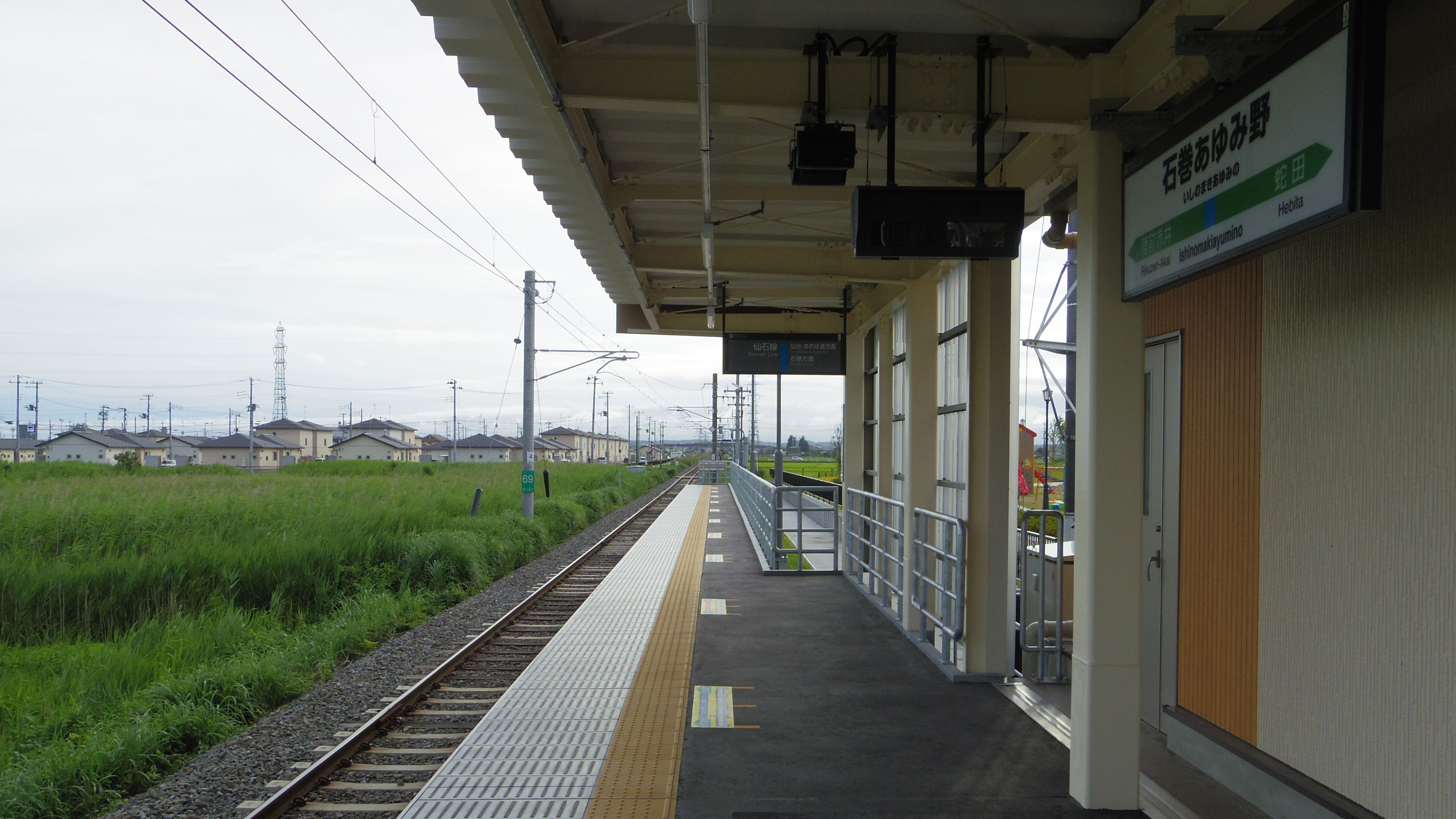
The platform in July 2016, looking toward Rikuzen-Arai

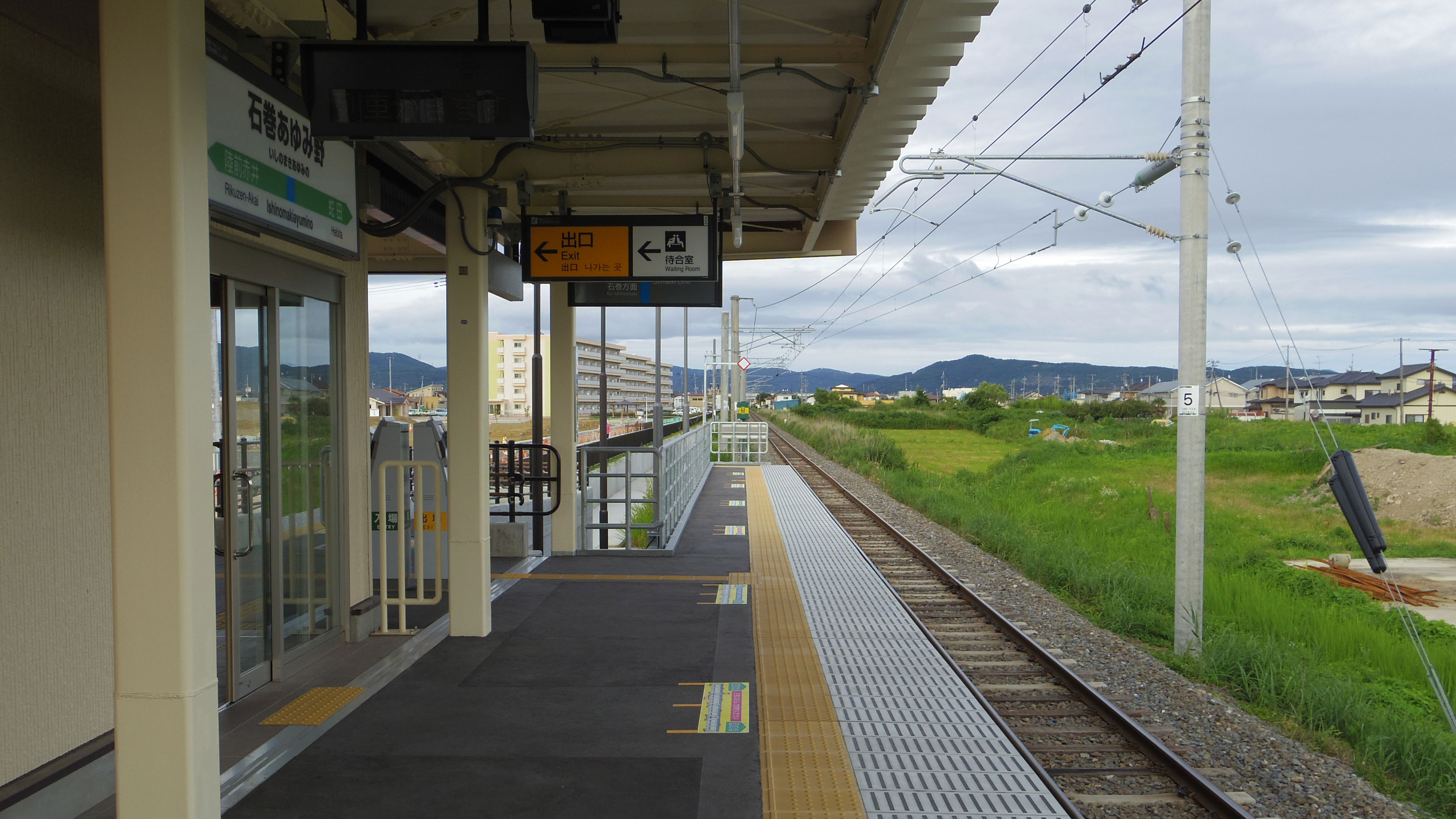
The platform in July 2016, looking toward Hebita

== History ==
The station opened on 26 March 2016. Construction of the station cost approximately 482 million yen, and this was funded by the city of Ishinomaki together with grants from the national government.

== Passenger statistics ==
The station is expected to be used by an average of 300 passengers daily.

== Surrounding area ==
- National Route 45
- Aeon Mall Ishinomaki
- Senseki Hospital

=== Schools ===
- Miyagi Prefectural Ishinomakinishi High School
- Ishinomaki Municipal Aoba Junior High School
- Ishinomaki Municipal Hebita Junior High School

== See also ==
- List of railway stations in Japan
