= Port of Ishinomaki =

Port in Ishinomaki, Japan

Coordinates: 38°24′56″N 141°16′16″E

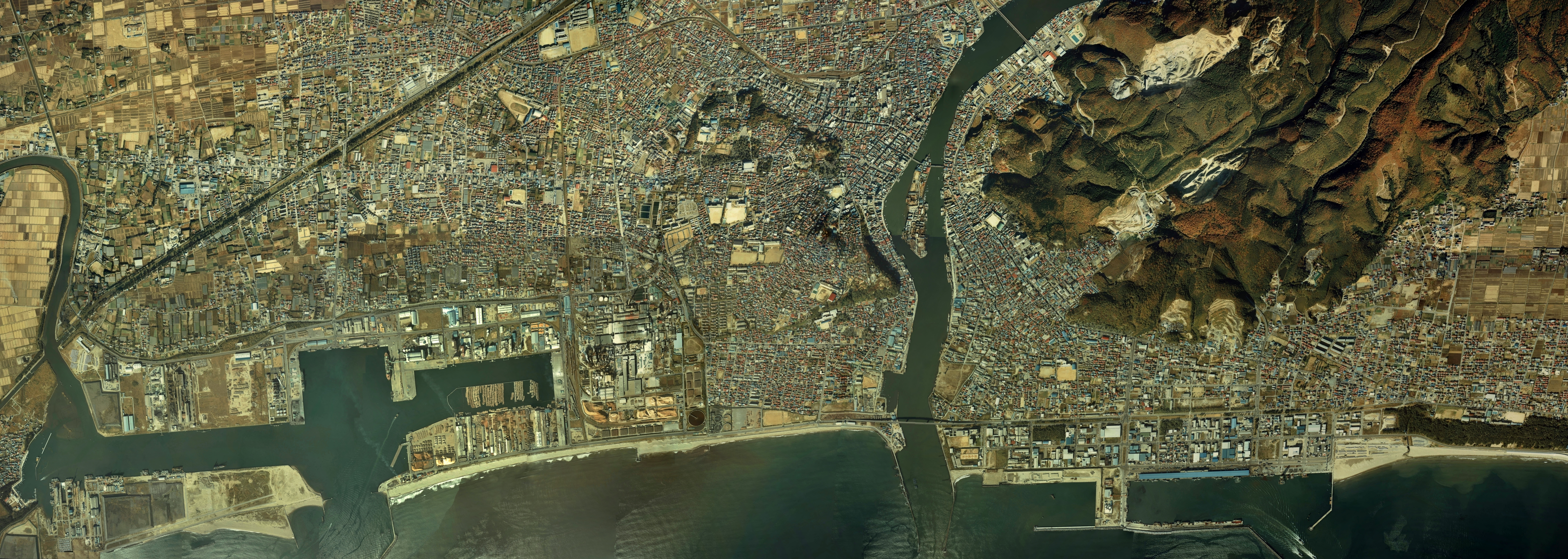
An aerial photograph of Ishinomaki Port and the central area of Ishinomaki City taken in 1984.

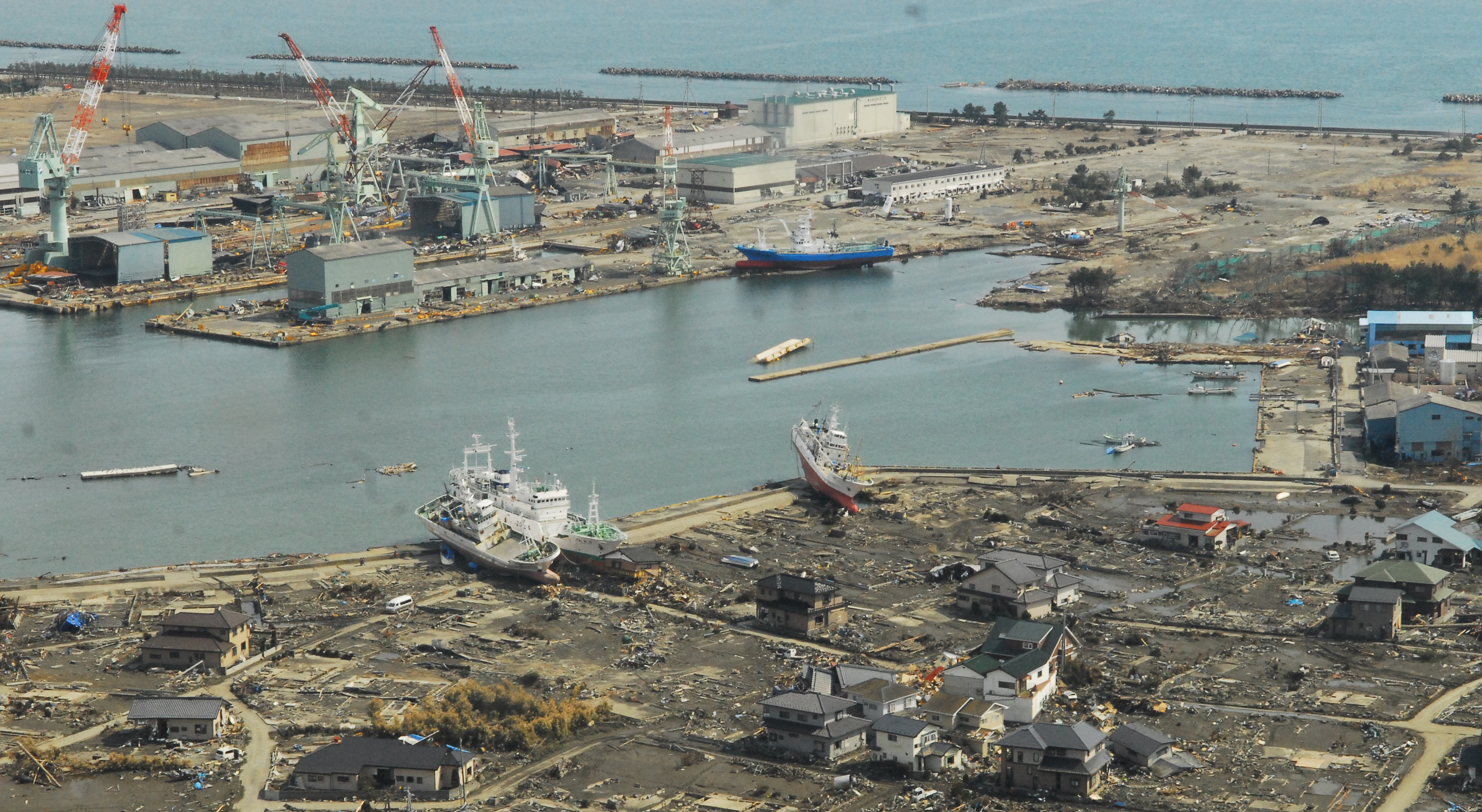
The Port of Ishinomaki, two weeks after the 2011 Tōhoku earthquake and tsunami.

The Port of Ishinomaki is a Specified Class 3 Fishing Port located in Ishinomaki City, Miyagi Prefecture, Japan. The port holds the Guinness World Record for the world's longest fish market, at 875.47 metres.
