= Hebita Station =

Railway station in Ishinomaki, Miyagi Prefecture, Japan

Hebita Station 蛇田駅
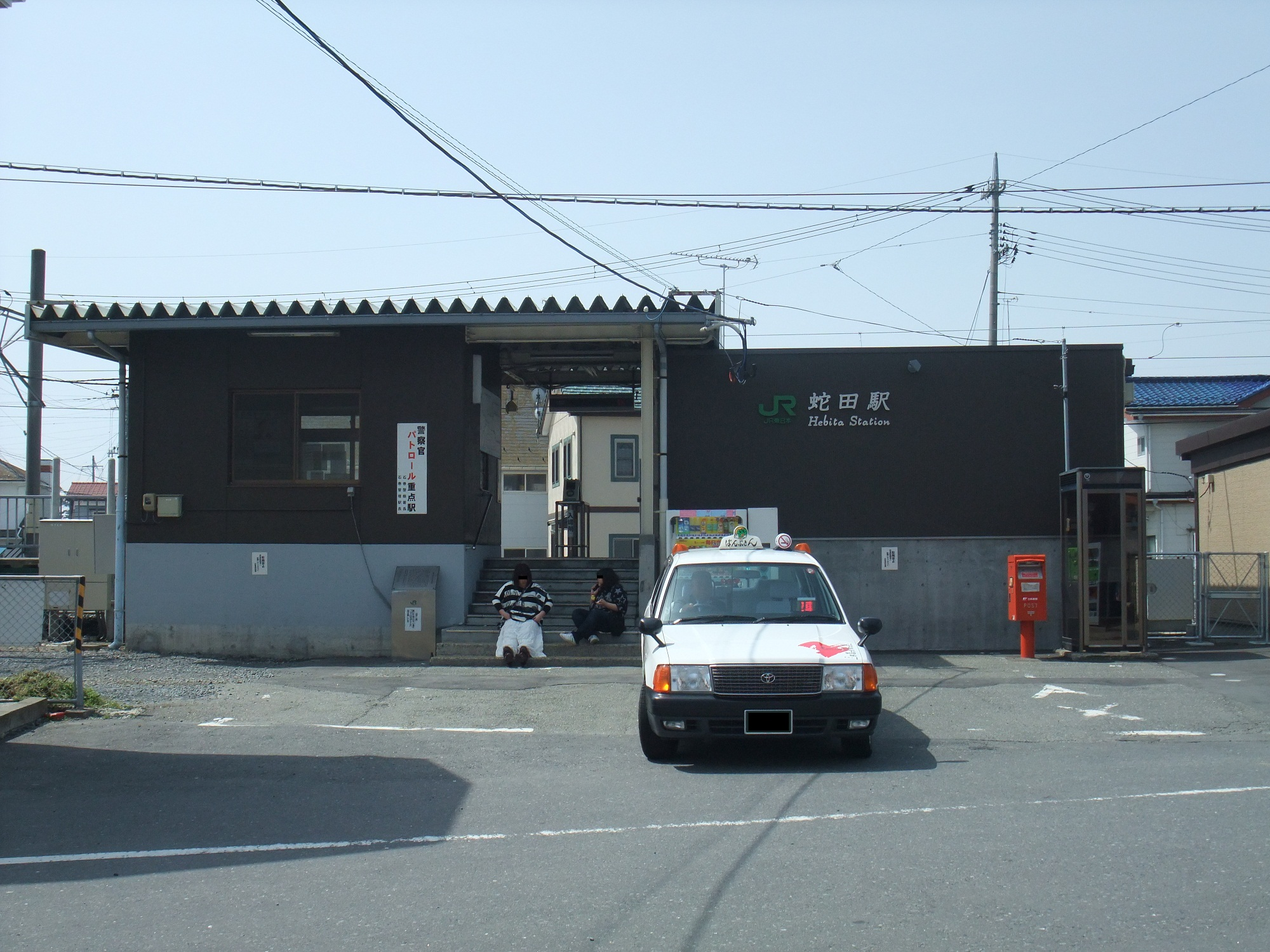
- Hebita Station in April 2012

General information
- Location: Hebita, Ishinomaki-shi, Miyagi-ken 986-0861; Japan
- Coordinates: 38.4384°N 141.2775°E
- Operator: JR East
- Line: ■ Senseki Line
- Distance: 46.6 km from Aoba-dōri
- Platforms: 1 side platform
- Tracks: 1

Other information
- Status: Unstaffed
- Website: www.jreast.co.jp/estation/station/info.aspx?StationCd=1396

History
- Opened: November 22, 1928

Services
| Preceding station | JR East | Following station |
|---|---|---|
| Ishinomakiayumino towards Sendai | Senseki-Tōhoku Line Rapid | Rikuzen-Yamashita towards Onagawa |
| Rikuzen-Akai One-way operation | Senseki-Tōhoku Line Rapid | Rikuzen-Yamashita towards Ishinomaki |
| Ishinomakiayumino towards Sendai | Senseki-Tōhoku Line Rapid | Rikuzen-Yamashita towards Ishinomaki |
| Ishinomakiayumino towards Aoba-dori | Senseki Line | Rikuzen-Yamashita towards Ishinomaki |
Location
- Location within Miyagi Prefecture Location within Japan

Hebita Station (蛇田駅, Hebita-eki) is a railway station in the city of Ishinomaki, Miyagi, Japan, operated by East Japan Railway Company (JR East).

== Lines ==
Hebita Station is served by the Senseki Line (including the Senseki-Tōhoku Line). It is located 46.6 kilometers from the terminus of the Senseki Line at Aoba-dōri Station.

== Station layout ==
The station has one side platform serving a single bidirectional track. The station is unstaffed.

== History ==
Hebita Station opened on November 22, 1928 as a station on the Miyagi Electric Railway. The Miyagi Electric Railway was nationalized on May 1, 1944. The station was absorbed into the JR East network upon the privatization of JNR on April 1, 1987. The station was closed from March 11, 2011 due to damage to the line associated with the 2011 Tōhoku earthquake and tsunami. Services were restored to Yamoto and Ishinomaki on July 16, 2011.

== Surrounding area ==
- National Route 45
- Hebita Post Office

== See also ==
- List of railway stations in Japan
