= Mai Mukaida =

Japanese make-up artist and businesswoman

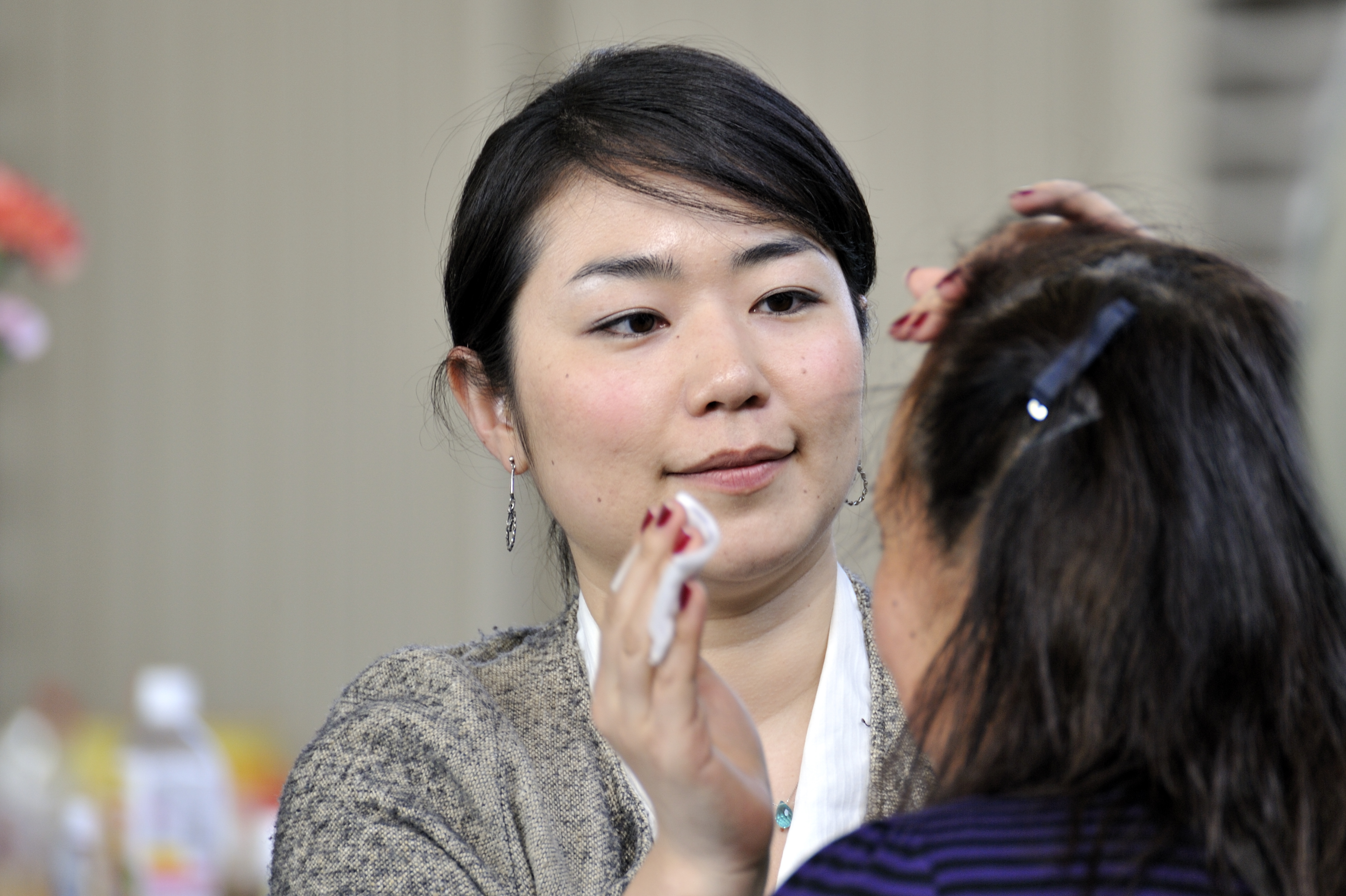
- Triple disaster relief effort Mukaida at a refugee shelter (May 2011)
- Born: 24 October 1982 (age 43); Ishinomaki, Miyagi, Japan
- Education: Keio University (SFC)
- Occupations: Make-up artist, Cosmetics company CEO

Mai Mukaida (Japanese: 向田 麻衣, Hepburn: Mukaida Mai; born 24 October 1982) is a Japanese make-up artist and businesswoman.

In 2009, Mukaida started the Coffret Project, which helps women in Nepal, who have been victims of human trafficking get their life back on track. She is the CEO of the cosmetics company Lalitpur, which she founded in May 2013. Mukaida was named the Avon Woman of the Year in 2012, and also received the Lohas Design Award.

== Biography ==
Mukaida was born on 24 October 1982 in Ishinomaki, Miyagi Prefecture. While attending Miyagi Gakuin High School, she visited Nepal, participating in an NGO for women's literacy. This experience inspired her to later work in Nepal. She then attended Keio University at the SFC, where she studied sociology under Eiji Oguma.

Starting in August 2008, Mukaida spent half a year doing NGO fieldwork in Turkey. She noticed that victims of human trafficking said, when asked what they dreamed of, that they wanted to dress up or wear cosmetics. In 2009, she began the Coffret Project, which helps women in Nepal who have been victims of human trafficking get their life back on track. After the earthquake, tsunami, and nuclear disaster in March 2011, Mukaida worked to help victims in her hometown by providing makeup. In 2012, one year after the triple disaster, she was named the Avon Woman of the Year for her work to improve the lives of Nepalese people. Later that year, she was awarded the Lohas Design Award from Development Associations for Youth leaders.

In May 2013, Mukaida established a cosmetics company called Lalitpur, meaning "city of beauty" in Sanskrit. Mukaida's goal was to create a product that could be made in Nepal and would be competitive in the industry. The company makes cosmetics with herbs and rock salt from the Himalayas.

Mukaida released the book Live "Beautiful Moments" in 2014.

== Works ==
- “美しい瞬間”を生きる [Live "Beautiful Moments"] (in Japanese). Discover Twenty-one. 2014. ISBN 978-4-7993-1522-4.
