= Ogatsu, Miyagi =

Ogatsu 雄勝町
- Interactive map of Ogatsu
- Country: Japan
- Region: Tōhoku
- Prefecture: Miyagi Prefecture
- City: Ishinomaki

Population (2009)
  - Total: Approx. 1,000

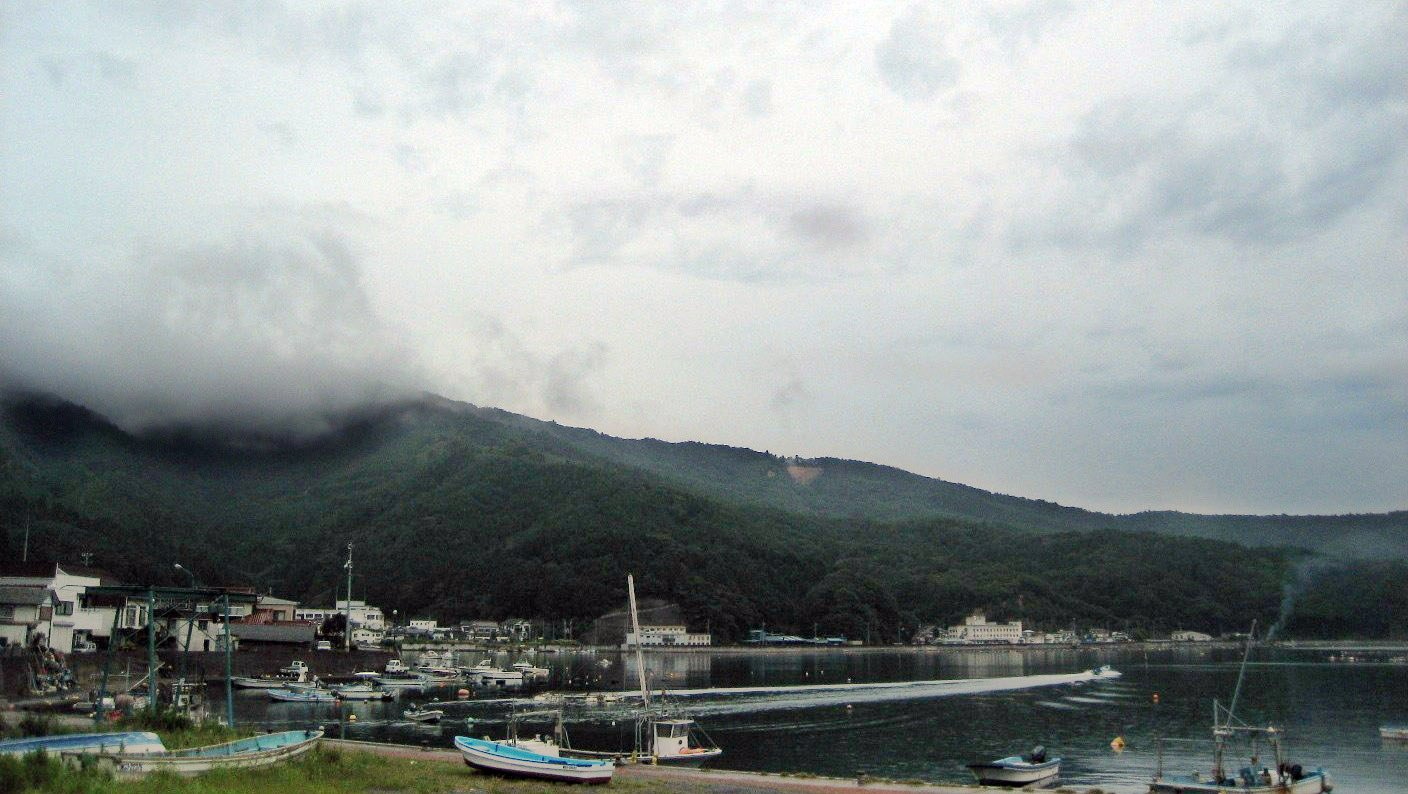
Ogatsu and Ogatsu Bay

Ogatsu (雄勝町, Ogatsu-chō) was a town formerly located in Monou District, Miyagi Prefecture, Japan.

On April 1, 2005, the old city of Ishinomaki absorbed the towns of Kahoku, Kanan, Kitakami, Monou and Ogatsu (all from the former Monou District), and the town of Oshika (from Oshika District) to more than quadruple its area and added nearly 60,000 people to its population.

Ogatsu was famous for its inkstones and had a scallop festival every year in the fall.

== Traditional performance art ==
- Ogatsu Houinkagura (雄勝法印神楽)
- Ogatsu-cho Dateno Kurofunetaiko (雄勝町伊達の黒船太鼓)
