= Ishinomori Manga Museum =

- 石ノ森萬画館
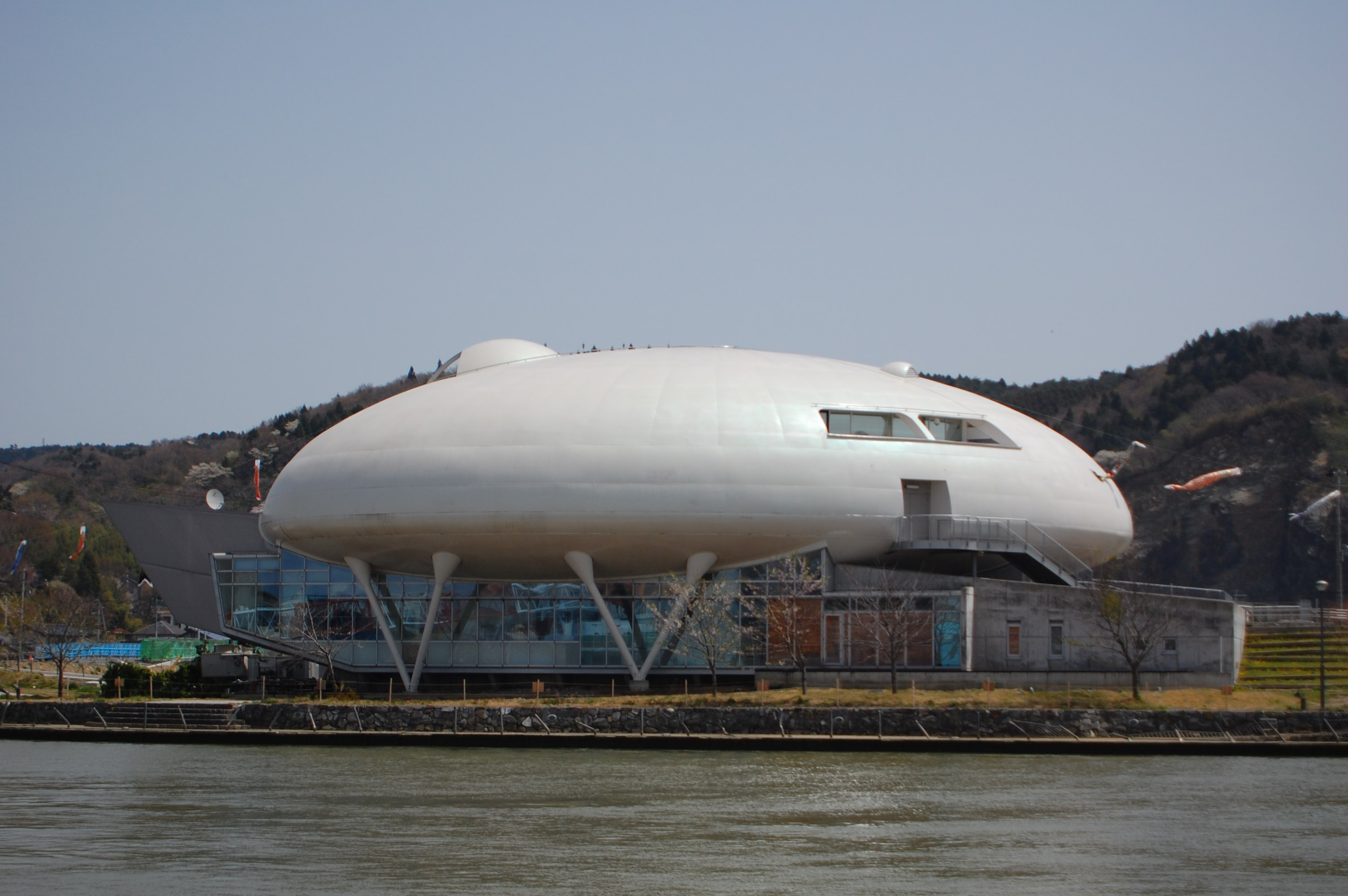

- Location within Miyagi Prefecture Location within Japan

General information
- Location: 2-7 Nakaze, Ishinomaki, Miyagi Prefecture, Japan
- Coordinates: 38.429631°N 141.31069°E
- Opened: July 23, 2001
- Renovated: September 28, 2013

Technical details
- Floor count: 3 above ground
- Floor area: 1,979.11 m2

Design and construction
- Architect: Nihon Sekkei Inc.

Website
- www.mangattan.jp/manga/

Ishinomori Manga Museum (石ノ森萬画館, Ishinomori Mangakan), also known as the Ishinomaki Mangattan Museum, is a museum in Ishinomaki, Miyagi Prefecture, Japan. It opened in 2001 to commemorate the works of manga artist and author Shotaro Ishinomori, who was born in what would become the present day Ishinomaki City. It sits on the bay facing the Pacific Ocean and Tashirojima, a.k.a. "Manga Island".

After the 2011 Tōhoku earthquake and tsunami, though still standing, the Ishinomori Manga Museum was closed for repairs before reopening on November 17, 2012. The following year, they had a renewal ceremony that included actors Hiroshi Fujioka and Yuki Sato as well as singer Ichirou Mizuki, who have all been involved in works created by Ishinomori.
