= Oshika District, Miyagi =

District in Miyagi prefecture, Japan

Coordinates: 38°27′11″N 141°26′42″E

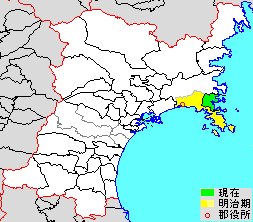
Map showing original extent of Oshika District in Miyagi Prefecture colored area=original extent in Meiji period; green=present area

Oshika (牡鹿郡, Oshika-gun) is a rural district located in Miyagi Prefecture, in the Tōhoku region of northern Japan.

Most of the city of Ishinomaki was formerly within the district. From 2006, the district has consisted only of the town of Onagawa. As of 2021, the district has an estimated population of 5,636 and a population density of 86.2 persons per km^{2}. The total area was 65.35 km^{2}.

== History ==
During the Edo period under the Tokugawa shogunate, the district was within Mutsu Province and was under the control of the Date clan of Sendai Domain. In 1869, following the Meiji restoration, Mutsu Province was divided, with the area of Oshika District becoming part of Rikuzen Province, and from 1872, part of Miyagi Prefecture.

In 1889, with the establishment of the municipalities, Oshika District was administratively divided into 2 towns (Ishinomaki and Watanoha) and 6 villages.

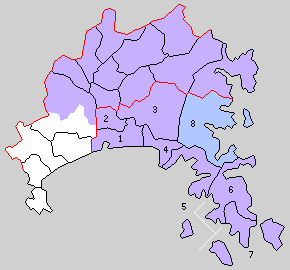
1. Ishinomaki; 2. Hebita; 3.Inai 4. Watanoha; 5. Oginohama; 6. Ohara; 7. Ayukawa; 8. Onagawa; Blue = no change in status; Purple = Ishinomaki City

The area was affected by the 2011 Tōhoku earthquake and tsunami.

=== Timeline ===
- April 1, 1923 : The village of Onagawa gained town status. (3 towns, 5 villages)
- April 1, 1933 : Ishinomaki annexes part of Hebita and was raised to city status. (2 towns, 5 villages)
- December 1, 1940 : The village of Ayukawa was raised to town status. (3 towns, 4 villages)
- January 1, 1955 : Ishinomaki annexed the remainder of Hebita village. (3 towns, 3 villages)
- March 26, 1955 : The town of Ayukawa and village of Ohara merged to form the town of Oshika. (3 towns, 2 villages)
- April 10, 1955 : The village of Oginohama was merged into Ishinomaki (3 towns, 1 village)
- April 1, 1959 : The village of Inai was raised to town status (4 towns)
- May 15, 1959 : Watanoha was divided between Ishinomaki and Inai (3 towns)
- March 23, 1967: The town of Inai was annexed by Ishinomaki. (2 towns)
- On April 1, 2005 : the town of Oshika merged with the towns of Kahoku, Kanan, Kitakami, Monou, and Ogatsu, all from Monou District, and Ishinomaki City to form a larger new Ishinomaki City. (1 town)
