= Sendai Kōriyama Kanga ruins =

Archaeological site in Sendai, Japan

Kōriyama ruins
- 郡山遺跡 (Japanese)
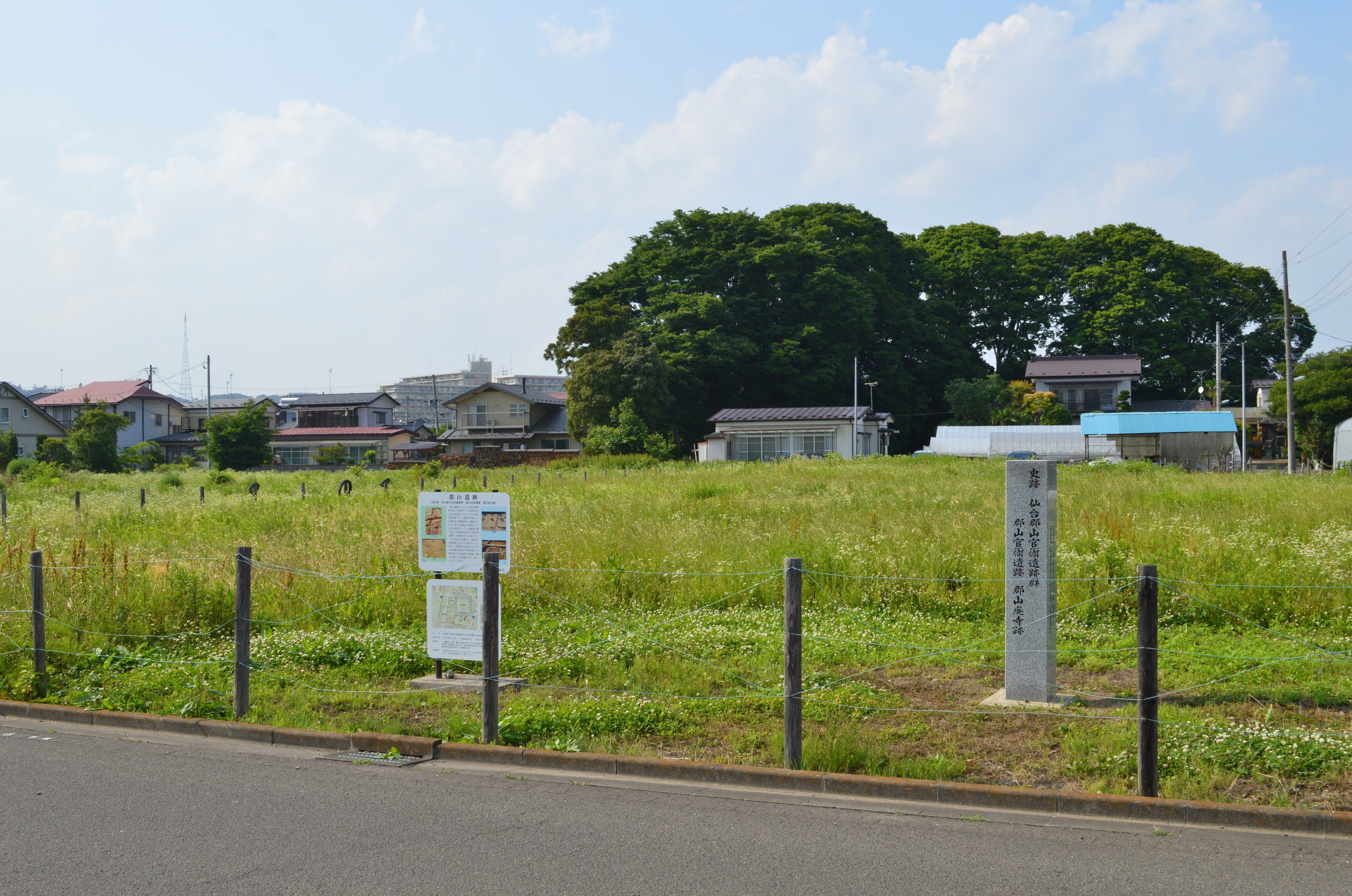
- Kōriyama ruins

- Kōriyama ruins Sendai Kōriyama Kanga ruins (Japan)
- 38°13′14″N 140°53′31″E
- Periods: Nara period
- Location: Taihaku-ku, Sendai, Miyagi Prefecture, Japan
- Region: Tōhoku region

History
- Built: 7th century AD

Site notes
- Excavation dates: 1979
- Public access: Yes

The Kōriyama ruins (郡山遺跡, Kōriyama iseki) is an archaeological site with the ruins of a Nara period government office complex, temple and temple ruins located in what is now part of Taihaku-ku in the city of Sendai, Miyagi prefecture in the southern Tōhoku region of northern Honshu, Japan. It has been protected by the central government as a National Historic Site since 2006.

== Background ==
In the Nara period, after the creation of a centralized government under the Ritsuryō system following the Taika Reform of 645 AD, the provincial capital with associated provincial temple was established for Mutsu Province. These structures only lasted for a short period, as Mutsu Province was only tenuously under the control of the central government, and was subject to frequent uprisings by the native Emishi tribes. This site is believed to have been abandoned in 724 AD when it was relocated to Taga Castle. The Kōriyama ruins are believed to be the ruins of this first attempt at establishing a provincial capital in Mutsu.

== Description ==
The ruins are located to the south of central Sendai, in between JR Nagamachi Station and the Japan National Route 4 Bypass. It is located on natural embankments with an altitude of about 8–12 meters, and covers an area of approximately 627,900 square meters. Excavations have been conducted since 1979, revealing a residential area from the end of the 6th century, and from the middle of the 7th century to the beginning of the 8th century, two periods of government offices.

The earlier (Phase I) government complex is approximately 300 meters east-west by 600 meters north-south, surrounded by a wooden palisade and a double set of moats. The complex is orientated 30 to 40 degrees east of true north. In the centre were granaries and miscellaneous houses, including numerous pit dwellings, which were divided from the administrative complex by an inner palisade measuring 90 meters by 120 meters. The later (Phase II) government complex was a town of four sections (428 square meters), oriented to the north and divided by timber rows and large moats. A large building located in the middle, slightly south of center, is presumed to be the government office, and was found also to contain the remnants of a garden with a pond. Excavated artifacts include numerous examples of Haji ware pottery, some of which was inscribed with the word "Natori" and roof tiles.

== Kōriyama temple ruins ==
The ruined temple complex is to the south, and has the standard temple layout for a provincial temple, as established in each of the provinces of Japan by Emperor Shōmu during the Nara period (710 – 794).

In the very lower layers of the site, relics from the late Jōmon period, traces of rice fields from the Yayoi period and traces of residences from the Kofun period were found, indicating that the site was in the center of a major ancient settlement.

Currently, most of the site is fallow fields or vacant lots, but the city plans to purchase the area to create a historical park. The site is about a 20-minute walk from Nagamachi Station on the JR East Tohoku Main Line.

== See also ==
- Higashiyama Kanga ruins
- Myōdate Kanga ruins
- List of Historic Sites of Japan (Miyagi)
