= Myōdate Kanga ruins =

- 名生館官衙遺跡 (Japanese)
- Myōdate Kanga ruins Myōdate Kanga ruins (Japan)
- 38°36′38″N 140°53′45″E
- Periods: Kofun period
- Location: Ōsaki, Miyagi, Japan
- Region: Tōhoku region

History
- Built: 7th - 8th century AD

Site notes
- Length: 1,100 m (3,600 ft)
- Width: 700 m (2,300 ft)
- Public access: Yes (no public facilities)

Myōdate Kanga ruins (名生館官衙遺跡, Myōdate Kangai iseki) is an archaeological site with the ruins of a Nara period government administrative complex located in what is now part of the city of Ōsaki, Miyagi prefecture in the Tōhoku region of far northern Honshu, Japan. It is protected by the central government as a National Historic Site. It slightly predates the construction of Taga Castle to the southeast.

== Background ==
In the late Nara period, after the establishment of a centralized government under the Ritsuryō system, the imperial court sent a number of military expeditions to what is now the Tōhoku region of northern Japan to bring the local Emishi tribes under its control. Towards the end of the sixth century, the central government established a provincial capital and several fortified local administrative centers in what is now Fukushima Prefecture and Miyagi Prefecture; however, many of these early centers were destroyed in Emishi uprisings, notably in 709 AD, which led to the establishment of Taga Castle and subsequent re-colonization of the region.

The Myōdate site was long believed to have been the location of the castle of the Ōsaki clan, who held the post of Ōshū Tandai in the Muromachi period. However, large quantities of roof tiles had always been uncovered by farmers in nearby fields, and when these case to the attention of archaeologists in the 1980s, it was quickly determined that the remains were actually from the Nara period. Subsequent excavation revealed that the site was mostly like a josaku-style Japanese castle dating from the late 7th to early 8th centuries. From its geographic location, the likely candidate is the Tamazukuri Castle (玉造柵, Tamazukuri-saku) mentioned in ancient records.

== Description ==
The ruins are located in the northeast of the Osaki plains of northern Miyagi Prefecture, a short distance to the south of the Daikichiyama Tile Kiln Site and several ruined Buddhist temples dating from Nara period. The site consists of the remnants of a square enclosure, approximately 700 meters east-west by 1110 meters north-south, with an earthen rampart, presumably surmounted by a wooden palisade. Inside the enclosure, post holes and foundation stones indicate the locations of political affairs and ceremonial buildings, and numerous warehouses. The ruins predate the establishment of Taga Castle. It is not known when or why the site was abandoned.

The ruins were backfilled after excavation and there is nothing to be seen at the site today except for rice fields and a commemorative stone marker. The site is located about a 10-minute walk from Higashi-Osaki Station on the JR East Rikuu East Line.

== See also ==
- Taga Castle
- Higashiyama Government Offices Site
- List of Historic Sites of Japan (Miyagi)
