= Miyazawa Site =

Miyazawa ruins
- 宮沢遺跡 (Japanese)
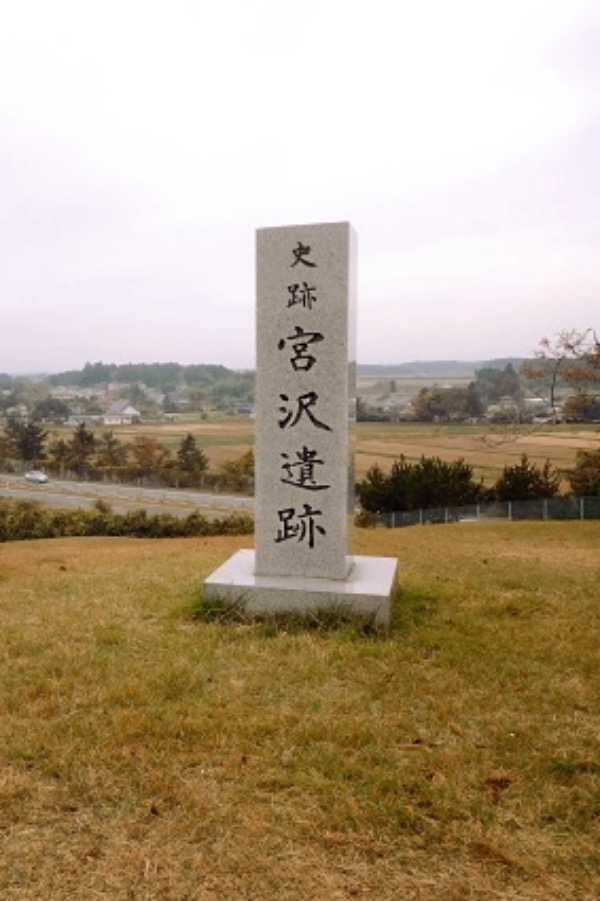
- Miyazawa ruins

- Location in Japan Miyazawa Site (Japan)
- 38°37′34.9″N 140°56′51.1″E
- Periods: Nara to early Heian period
- Location: Ōsaki, Miyagi, Japan
- Region: Tōhoku region

Site notes
- Elevation: 50 m (160 ft)
- Length: 1,400 m (4,600 ft)
- Width: 800 m (2,600 ft)
- Public access: Yes (no facilities)

Miyazawa ruins (宮沢遺跡, Miyazawa iseki) is an archaeological site located in the Furukawa district of what is now the city of Ōsaki, Miyagi Prefecture in the Tōhoku region of northern Japan. The site contains a late Nara period to early Heian period jōsaku-style Japanese castle. It has been protected by the central government as a National Historic Site since 1976.

== Overview ==
In the late Nara period, after the establishment of a centralized government under the Ritsuryō system, the imperial court sent a number of military expeditions to what is now the Tōhoku region of northern Japan to bring the local Emishi tribes under its control. After the establishment of Taga Castle, Yamato forces gradually pushed into the hinterland of what is now Miyagi Prefecture, establishing several fortified settlements against increasing Emishi opposition.

The ruins of a very large fortification were discovered during construction work on the Tōhoku Expressway in 1974, and the site was excavated by the Miyagi Prefectural Board of Education from 1974-1977. The site is in a hilly area on the northern edge of the Ōsaki Plain at an altitude of around 50 meters, and extends 1400 meters east-west by 850 meters north-south. The roughly rectangular compound is surrounded by earthen ramparts, moat and a wooden palisade. Inside, post holes for buildings and the foundations of pit dwellings have been discovered, along with Sue pottery fragments and metal implements. From the style of the pottery discovered, the site was dated to the early Heian period. However, the fortification does not appear in any historical records, and there is some uncertainty if this was a josaku-type fortification, or the remains of a fortified government office site for Nagaoka District.

Part of the site has been made into an archaeological park, which is also known for its cherry blossoms in spring. The site is approximately 30 minutes by car from Furukawa Station on the Tohoku Shinkansen.

== See also ==
- List of Historic Sites of Japan (Miyagi)
- Iji Castle
