= Nakaniida Bach Hall =

Concert hall in Miyagi Prefecture, Japan

Nakaniida Bach Hall 中新田バッハホール
- Interactive map of the Nakaniida Bach Hall 中新田バッハホール area
- Alternative names: Kami-machi Nakaniida Bunka Kaikan (加美町中新田文化会館)

General information
- Location: 101 Ipponsugi, Kami, Miyagi Prefecture, Japan
- Coordinates: 38°34′06″N 140°51′58″E
- Construction started: 1 December 1979
- Completed: 15 February 1981
- Opened: 15 May 1981

Other information
- Seating capacity: 684

Website
- Official website ((in Japanese))

Nakaniida Bach Hall (中新田バッハホール, Nakaniida Bahha Hōru) is a concert hall that opened in Nakaniida, now Kami, Miyagi Prefecture, Japan, in 1981. Rising "majestically out of a rice field", the hall boasts a fine acoustic and has hosted international ensembles including the Scottish Chamber Orchestra, Academy of St Martin in the Fields, London Baroque, Tallis Scholars, Deutsche Bachsolisten, Ensemble Wien-Berlin, Trio à cordes de Paris, and Smetana Quartet, as well as being home to the amateur Bach Hall Orchestra.

== See also ==
- Miyagi Prefectural Auditorium
- Funagata Renpō Prefectural Natural Park
- Higashiyama Kanga ruins
