= Hinodeyama Tile Kiln Site =

Remains of Nara period kilns in Shikama, Japan

Hinodeyama tile kiln ruins
- 日の出山瓦窯跡 (Japanese)
- Hinodeyama tile kiln ruins Hinodeyama Tile Kiln Site (Japan)
- 38°30′53″N 140°48′12″E
- Periods: Nara period
- Location: Shikama, Miyagi, Japan
- Region: Tōhoku region

Site notes
- Elevation: 25 m (82 ft)
- Public access: Yes

Hinodeyama Tile Kiln ruins (日の出山瓦窯跡, Hinodeyama Kawara-gama ato) is an archaeological site consisting of the remains of seven Nara period kilns located in what is now the town of Shikama, Miyagi Prefecture in the Tōhoku region of northern Japan. It has been protected by the central government as a National Historic Site since 1976.

== Overview ==
As the imperial government extended control over Mutsu Province in the 8th Century AD, a number of fortified administrative centers and Buddhist temples were built in the area centered on Taga Castle. One feature of the buildings in these structures was the use of tiled roofs, which was a symbol of continental culture and the advanced state of the central administration. The Hinodeyama Kilns are one of several which have been found within what is now Miyagi Prefecture. These kilns were located in hilly land, near the sources of clay and fuel for the kilns; however, from the design patterns on shards found at the site, it can be determined that the tiles from the Hinodeyama kilns were used at Taga Castle, 40 kilometers to the south, among other areas. The site is contemporary with the Daikichiyama tile kiln ruins and both kilns supplied the various government administrative complexes (such as at the Higashiyama Kanga ruins) located around the province.

There are seven kilns at the site, six of which were used for roof tile production, and one of which was used to make Sue pottery. The kilns are built underground into the slope of a hill, and are a stepless form of the traditional anagama kiln. Each has a length of approximately five meters and a width and height of one meter. Shards found at the location indicate that cylindrical, curved and flat tiles were all produced.

The site was backfilled after excavation and is now a grassy slope with a stone monument marking the location. The site is about 20 minutes by car from Nishi-Furukawa Station on the JR East Rikuu East Line.

== See also ==
- List of Historic Sites of Japan (Miyagi)
