= List of historic sites of Japan (Miyagi) =

This list is of the historic sites of Japan located within the Prefecture of Miyagi.

== National Historic Sites ==
As of 1 December 2020, thirty-seven Sites have been designated as being of national significance (including one *Special Historic Site); the Dewa Sendai Kaidō Nakayamagoe Pass spans the prefectural borders with Yamagata.

Site	Municipality	Comments	Image	Coordinates	Type	Ref.
*Taga-jō ruins 多賀城跡附寺跡 Taga-jō ato tsuketari tera ato	Tagajō	Nara period castle ruins	Taga-jō ruins	38°18′22″N 140°59′18″E	2, 3	181
Iji Castle ruins 伊治城跡 Iji-jō ato	Kurihara	Nara period castle ruins		38°45′51″N 141°02′18″E	2	3372
Tōmizuka Kofun 遠見塚古墳 Tōmizuka kofun	Wakabayashi-ku, Sendai	Kofun period tumulus	Tōmizuka Kofun	38°14′17″N 140°54′52″E	1	210
Koganeyama Gold Mine 黄金山産金遺跡 Koganeyama sankin iseki	Wakuya	Nara period gold mine, where gold was extracted for the Tōdai-ji Daibutsu	Koganeyama Gold Mining Site	38°33′36″N 141°08′22″E	6	208
Iwakiri Castle ruins 岩切城跡 Iwakiri-jō ato	Miyagino-ku, Sendai	Muromachi period castle ruins	Iwakiri Castle ruins	38°18′49″N 140°56′28″E	2	231
Miyazawa Site 宮沢遺跡 Miyazawa iseki	Ōsaki	Nara/Heian period fortification ruins	Miyazawa Site	38°37′34″N 140°56′55″E	2	225
Former Yūbikan and Garden 旧有備館および庭園 kyū-Yūbikan oyobi teien	Ōsaki	Edo period han school and gardens; also a Place of Scenic Beauty	Former Yūbikan and Garden	38°39′27″N 140°51′48″E	4	185
Former Arikabe-juku Honjin 旧有壁宿本陣 kyū-Arikabe-juku honjin	Kurihara	Edo period shukuba	Former Arikabe-juku Honjin	38°52′04″N 141°07′31″E	6	213
Sanjūsangendō Kanga ruins 三十三間堂官衙遺跡 Sanjūsangendō kanga iseki	Watari	Heian period county headquarters		38°04′04″N 140°51′07″E	2	236
Sannō-Gakoi Site 山王囲遺跡 Sannō-Gakoi iseki	Kurihara	Jōmon period settlement ruins	Sannō-Gakoi Site	38°44′29″N 140°56′56″E	1	214
Yamamae Site 山前遺跡 Yamamae iseki	Misato	Jōmon period settlement ruins	Yamamae Site	38°32′19″N 141°02′55″E	1	223
Yamahata Cave Tomb Cluster 山畑横穴群 Yamahata yokoana-gun	Ōsaki	Kofun period cave tombs		38°31′15″N 140°55′34″E	1	217
Numazu Shell Mound 沼津貝塚 Numazu kaizuka	Ishinomaki	Jōmon period shell midden		38°26′43″N 141°22′40″E	1	216
Jō Palisade Site 城生柵跡 Jō-no-saku iseki	Kami	Nara period castle ruins		38°35′00″N 140°51′06″E	2	230
Nishinohama Shell Mound 西の浜貝塚 Nishinohama kaizuka	Matsushima	Jōmon period shell midden		38°22′53″N 141°04′57″E	1	218
Sendai Kōriyama Kanga ruins 仙台郡山官衙遺跡群 Sendai Kōriyama kanga iseki-gun	Taihaku-ku, Sendai	Nara period provincial capital ruins; designation includes the Kōriyama temple ruins (郡山廃寺跡)	Sendai Kōriyama Kanga ruins	38°13′14″N 140°53′31″E	2	00003496
Sendai Castle 仙台城跡 Sendai-jō ato	Aoba-ku, Sendai	Edo period castle	Sendai Castle	38°15′12″N 140°51′10″E	2	3371
Sendai Domain Hanayama Village Nuruyu Bansho 仙台藩花山村寒湯番所跡 Sendai-han Hanayama-mura Nuruyu-bansho ato	Kurihara	Edo period magistrate's office	Sendai Domain Hanayama Village Nuruyu Bansho Site	38°51′43″N 140°46′42″E	6	204
Daikichiyama Tile Kiln Site 大吉山瓦窯跡 Daikichiyama kawara kama ato	Ōsaki	Heian period kiln ruins		38°37′23″N 140°55′17″E	6	221
Daigigakoi Shell Mound 大木囲貝塚 Daigigakoi kaizuka	Shichigahama	Jōmon period shell midden	Daigigakoi Shell Mound	38°18′18″N 141°02′38″E	1	209
Nakazawame Shell Mound 中沢目貝塚 Nakazawame kaizuka	Ōsaki	Jōmon period shell midden		38°37′15″N 141°05′54″E	1	234
Nagane Shell Mound 長根貝塚 Nagane kaizuka	Wakuya	Jōmon period shell midden		38°36′06″N 141°08′40″E	1	212
Higashiyama Kanga ruins 東山官衙遺跡 Higashiyama kanga iseki	Kami	Heian period county headquarters		38°35′56″N 140°48′12″E	2	3209
Hinodeyama Tile Kiln Site 日の出山瓦窯跡 Hinodeyama kawara kama ato	Shikama	Heian period kiln ruins		38°30′53″N 140°52′59″E	6	222
Iinozaka Kofun Cluster 飯野坂古墳群 Iinozaka kofun-gun	Natori	Kofun period tumuli		38°09′44″N 140°52′38″E	1	228
Myōdate Kanga ruins 名生館官衙遺跡 Myōdate kanga iseki	Ōsaki	Heian period county headquarters		38°36′38″N 140°53′45″E	2	232
Kido Tile Kiln Site 木戸瓦窯跡 Kido kawara kama ato	Ōsaki	Heian period kiln ruins		38°37′17″N 141°02′25″E	6	220
Raijinyama Kofun 雷神山古墳 Raijinyama kofun	Natori	Kofun period tumulus	Raijinyama Kofun	38°09′04″N 140°52′48″E	1	202
Satohama Shell Mound 里浜貝塚 Satohama kaizuka	Higashimatsushima	Jōmon period shell midden	Satohama Shell Mound	38°20′20″N 141°08′30″E	1	237
Mutsu Kokubun-ji ruins 陸奥国分寺跡 Mutsu Kokubunji ato	Wakabayashi-ku, Sendai	provincial temple of Mutsu Province	Mutsu Kokubunji Site	38°15′05″N 140°54′10″E	3	180
Mutsu Kokubun-niji ruins 陸奥国分尼寺跡 Mutsu Kokubunniji ato	Wakabayashi-ku, Sendai	provincial nunnery of Mutsu Province	Mutsu Kokubunniji Site	38°15′06″N 140°54′34″E	3	180
Mutsu Kami Kaidō 陸奥上街道 Mutsu kami kaidō	Ōsaki	Ancient highway	Mutsu Kami Kaidō	38°40′51″N 140°52′06″E	6	201
Yanase-ura Site 梁瀬浦遺跡 Yanaseura iseki	Kakuda	Jōmon period settlement ruins		38°00′26″N 140°45′17″E	1	235
Grave of Hayashi Shihei 林子平墓 Hayashi Shihei no haka	Aoba-ku, Sendai	Bakumatsu period military scholar grave	Hayashi Shihei Grave	38°16′36″N 140°51′04″E	7	227
Dewa Sendai Kaidō Nakayamagoe Pass 出羽仙台街道中山越 Dewa Sendai kaidō Nakayamagoe	Ōsaki	Ancient highway; Designation includes an area of Mogami in Yamagata Prefecture	Dewa Sendai Kaidō Nakayamagoe Pass	38°43′32″N 140°39′32″E	6	194
Irinosawa Site 入の沢遺跡 Irinosawa iseki	Kurihara	Jōmon period settlement ruins		38°43′48″N 141°01′17″E	1	00003989
Akai Kanga Ruins 赤井官衙遺跡群; Akai kanga iseki-gun	Higashimatsushima	designation includes the Yomoto Cave Tombs (矢本横穴)		38°24′32″N 141°10′56″E	2	

== Prefectural Historic Sites ==
As of 20 May 2020, fifteen Sites have been designated as being of prefectural importance.

Site	Municipality	Comments	Image	Coordinates	Type	Ref.
Kamezuka Kofun かめ塚古墳; Kamezuka kofun	Iwanuma			38°07′18″N 140°52′10″E		
Nagiriya temple ruins 菜切谷廃寺跡; Nagiriya Haiji ato	Kami			38°35′07″N 140°51′42″E		
Toya-Hachiman Kofun 鳥屋八幡古墳; Toya-Hachiman kofun	Taiwa			38°24′33″N 140°55′51″E		
Daimachi Kofun Cluster 台町古墳群; Daimachi kofun-gun	Marumori			37°54′42″N 140°47′31″E		
Tomizawa Magaibutsu 富沢磨崖仏群; Tomizawa magaibutsu-gun	Shibata			38°06′46″N 140°48′48″E		
Takanosu Kofun Cluster 鷹の巣古墳群; Takanosu kofun-gun	Shiroishi			38°00′04″N 140°38′15″E		
Izumisawa Kofun Cluster 和泉沢古墳群; Izumisawa kofun-gun	Ishinomaki			38°32′31″N 141°19′45″E		
Toriyagasaki Kofun Cluster 鳥矢ヶ崎古墳群; Toriyagasaki kofun-gun	Kurihara			38°48′44″N 141°00′22″E		
Hedahara Shell Mound 平田原貝塚; Hedahara kaizuka	Higashimatsushima			38°27′23″N 141°11′15″E		
Atagoyama Kofun - Yakushidō Kofun 愛宕山古墳・附薬師堂古墳; Atagoyama kofun tsuketari Yakushidō kofun	Murata			38°05′33″N 140°42′57″E		
Nitoda Shell Mound 仁斗田貝塚; Nitoda kaizuka	Ishinomaki			38°17′40″N 141°25′24″E		
Tatsuganesan Sutra Mounds 田束山経塚群; Tatsuganesan kyōzuka-gun	Minamisanriku			38°44′59″N 141°28′01″E		
Semine Ichirizuka 瀬峰一里塚; Semine ichirizuka	Kurihara			38°39′46″N 141°02′12″E		
Neyaji Kofun Cluster 念南寺古墳群; Neyaji kofun-gun	Shikama			38°31′57″N 140°52′59″E		
Yoshiokahigashi Kanga ruins Site 吉岡東官衙遺跡; Yoshiokahigashi kanga iseki	Taiwa			38°26′18″N 140°53′42″E		

== Municipal Historic Sites ==
As of 1 May 2020, a further two hundred and fifty Sites have been designated as being of municipal importance.

== See also ==
- Cultural Properties of Japan
- Tōhoku History Museum
- List of Places of Scenic Beauty of Japan (Miyagi)
- List of Cultural Properties of Japan - paintings (Miyagi)
