= Nakayamagoe Pass =

Mountain pass in Yamagata, Japan

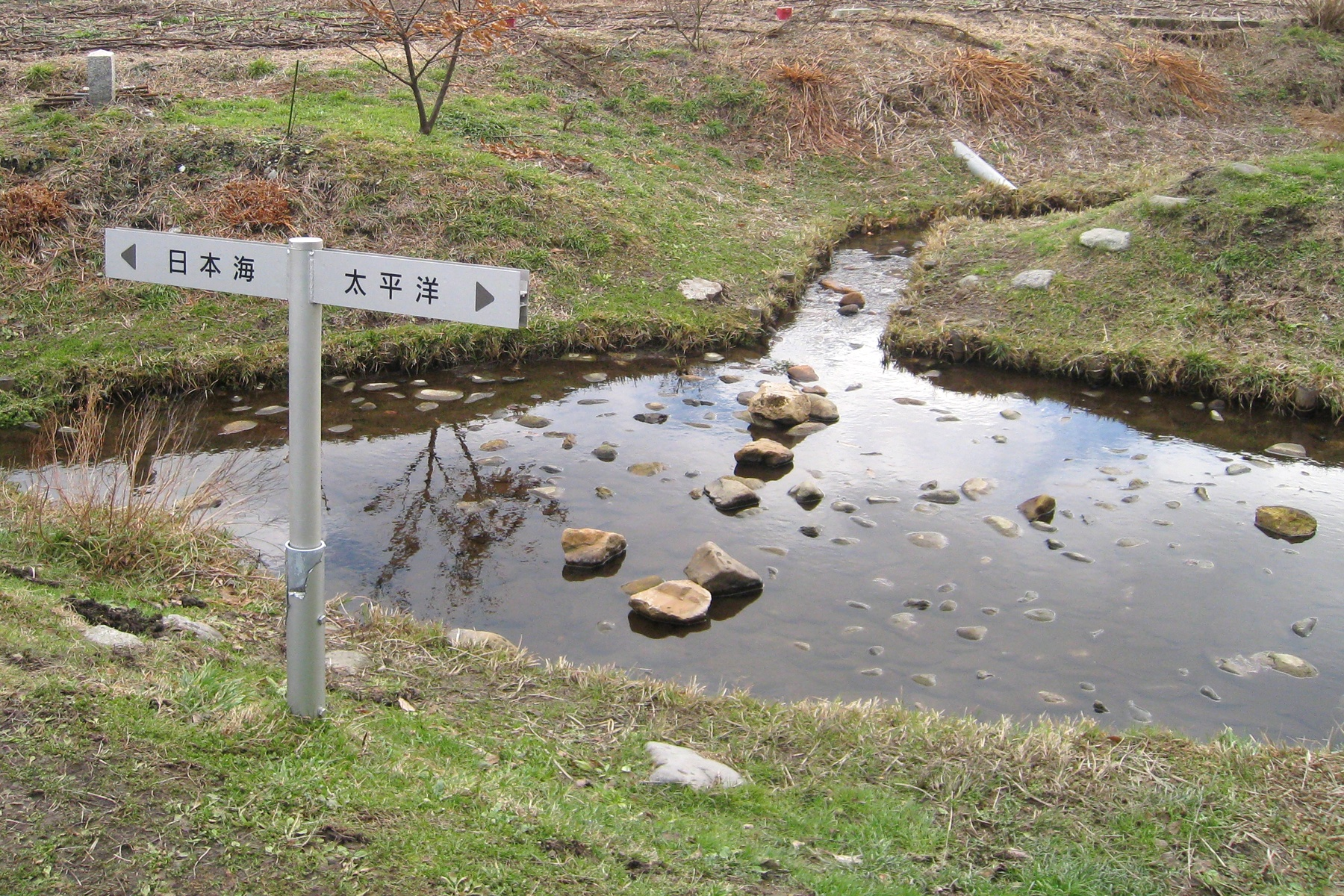
- Watershed at Nakayamagoe Pass

- Location within Miyagi Prefecture Location within Japan
- Elevation: 350 metres (1,150 ft)
- Traversed by: Dewa Sendai Kaidō

Third Approach
- Location: Mogami, Yamagata, Japan
- Range: Ōu Mountains
- Coordinates: 38°44′15″N 140°36′59″E
- National Historic Site of Japan

The Nakayamagoe Pass (中山越, Nakayamagoe) is a mountain pass in Ōu Mountains on the Dewa Sendai Kaidō, a branch of the Ōshū Kaidō highway, which connected Sendai in what is now Miyagi Prefecture with Sakata in what is now Yamagata Prefecture on the Sea of Japan. It was proclaimed a National Historic Site in 1990.

== Overview ==
The route of the Edo period Dewa Sendai Kaidō is in parallel with the current Japan National Route 47 and the JR East Rikuu East Line, crossing the Ōu Mountains at the Nakayama Pass. This is a very ancient route, dating to the early Heian period when it was used to connect Taga Castle on the Pacific coast of Japan with Akita Castle on the Sea of Japan. The route was developed by the Tokugawa shogunate due to the development of copper mines in the area and was of great economic importance in connecting Sendai Domain with the kitamaebune coastal trade with western Japan. It was also the route taken by the famed haiku master, Matsuo Basho, on his journey from Hiraizumi to the Dewa Sanzan, as recounted in Oku no Hosomichi

A section of the old highway with a total length of 4.2 kilometers from Naruko Onsen in Ōsaki, Miyagi to Sakaida in Mogami, Yamagata was designated as the Dewa Sendai Kaidō Nakayamagoe Pass (出羽仙台街道中山越, Dewa Sendai Kaidō Nakayamagoe) National Historical Site. It is about a 20 minute walk from Naruko-Onsen Station on the JR Rikuu East Line.

== See also ==
- List of Historic Sites of Japan (Miyagi)
- List of Historic Sites of Japan (Yamagata)
