= Iwakiri Castle =

- 岩切城
- Miyagino-ku, Sendai, Miyagi Prefecture, Japan
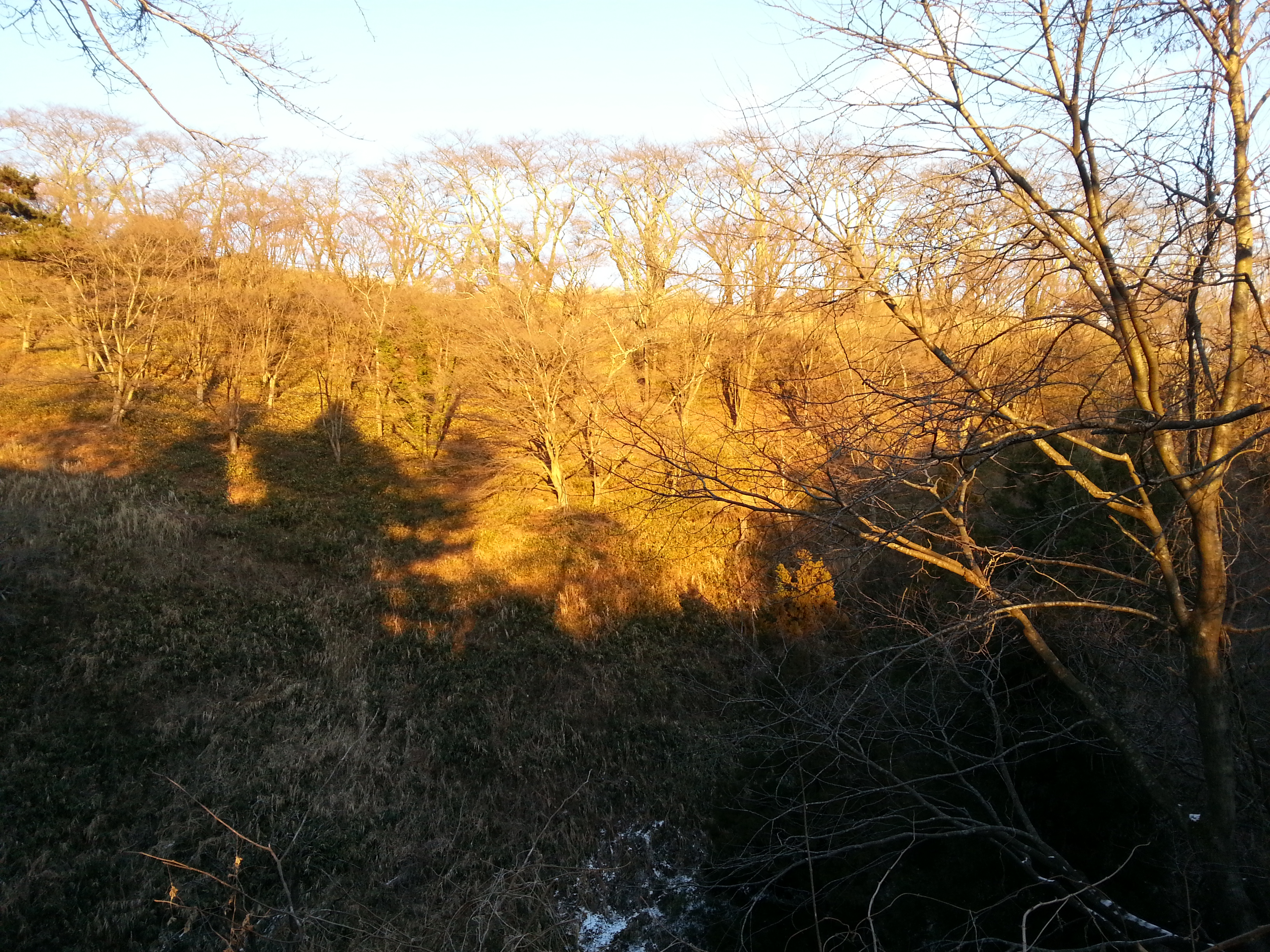

Site information
- Type: yamashiro-style Japanese castle
- Open to the public: yes (no public facilities)
- Condition: ruins

Location
- Iwakiri Castle Iwakiri Castle (Japan)
- Coordinates: 38°18′48.3″N 140°56′24″E

Site history
- Built: c.1336-1392
- Built by: Rusu clan
- In use: Muromachi to Sengoku periods
- Demolished: 1570-1573

Iwakiri Castle (岩切城, Iwakiri-jō) was a Muromachi period Japanese castle located in what is now the ward of Miyagino-ku, in the city of Sendai, Miyagi Prefecture, in the Tōhoku region of northern Japan. The site has been protected as a National Historic Site since 1982. It was also referred to as Takamori Castle (高森城, Takamori-jō) The castle was home castle of Rusu clan.

== History ==
The actual date of Iwakiri Castle’s foundation is unknown; however, it is said to have been founded by the Isawa clan in the 14th century. The Isawa claimed descent from the Fujiwara clan and served as retainers of Minamoto no Yoritomo in the region after the destruction of the Northern Fujiwara at Hiraizumi. The Isawa clan later changed their surname to the Rusu clan and ruled the area for the Kamakura shogunate from Taga Castle. During the Nanboku-cho period, the Rusu sided with the Southern Court and pledged fealty to the Chinjufu shōgun Kitabatake Akiie. However, after the establishment of the Muromachi shogunate and the retreat of the Southern Court to Yoshino, the Rusu but later switched sides to support the Northern Court and became retainers of Hatakeyama Tadakuni. The castle was attacked by Kira Sadaie during the Kannō disturbance and the Rusu clan was defeated. After the defeat of Ashikaga Tadayoshi, the clan’s fortunes were revived, but this time as retainers of the Osaki clan. Into the Sengoku period, the Osaki clan was gradually eclipsed by the Date clan. By the year 1500, the Rusu clan became retainers of the Date, and a Masakage, a son of Date Harumune, was adopted by the Rusu clan as their chieftain. In 1569, Rusu Masakage moved his seat from Iwakiri to nearby Rifu Castle, after having suppressed a local rebellion by the Muraoka clan. Rusu Masakage went on to become one of Date Masamune’s senior generals, and was eventually given a fief at Mizusawa Castle, where the clan remained until the end of the Edo period. However, after the move from Iwakiri to Rifu, Iwakiri Castle was abandoned and fell slowly into ruin.

== Description ==
The castle was located one ri west of Taga Castle, the provincial capital of Mutsu Province. Located near the Ōshū Kaidō and the junction of the Nanakita River with the Sunaoishi River, it was well sited to control communications between Taga Castle and its hinterland.

Iwakiri Castle was a mountain castle, with a total area approximately 600 meters long and 400 meters wide, but divided into several oblong-shaped enclosures along an M-shaped ridge on the slopes of the 106-meter-tall (348 ft) Mount Takamori. The Inner bailey is roughly 20 meters by 80 meters in size, with secondary enclosures both above and below with dry moats. All of these enclosures have earthen ramparts. The eastern bailey is the larger enclosure, measuring approximately 80 meters in diameter, and housed the main residential area of the castle. It was also surrounded by ramparts and dry moats. Along the western line is a gentle slope up the hillside, with many small enclosures separated by dry moats and clay walls to prevent intrusion by an enemy.

Today, the site is named Takamoriyama Park, and only a few fragments of the ramparts remain. It is located within a prefectural forest and is famous for its cherry blossoms. The site of the castle is about two kilometers northwest of Iwakiri Station on the JR East Tōhoku Main Line.

== See also ==
- List of Historic Sites of Japan (Miyagi)
