= Jō Palisade Site =

Nara period archaeological site in Kami, Tōhoku, Japan

Jō Palisade site 城生柵跡
- Kami, Miyagi Prefecture, Japan

Site information
- Type: jōsaku-style Japanese castle
- Open to the public: yes (no facilities)
- Condition: archaeological site

Location
- Coordinates: 38°34′53.4″N 140°51′16″E

Site history
- Built: c.737 AD
- Demolished: unknown

The Jō Palisade site (城生柵跡, Jō-no-saku ato) is an archaeological site with the ruins of a Nara period jōsaku-style Japanese castle, located in what is now part of the town of Kami in Kami District, Miyagi prefecture in the Tōhoku region of far northern Honshu, Japan. The site was proclaimed a National National Historic Site in 1979. The actual name of this fortification remains unknown, and it has been postulated that it was one of the five fortifications, possibly the “Shikama-saku” or “Takazukuri-saku”, mentioned in historical records, as having even constructed in 737 AD, although evidence is scant. It is roughly contemporary with the much larger Taga Castle to the southeast.

== Background ==
In the late Nara period, after the establishment of a centralized government under the Ritsuryō system, the Yamato court sent a number of military expeditions to what is now the Tōhoku region of northern Japan to bring the local Emishi tribes under its control. Per the Shoku Nihongi, following a huge earthquake in the year 715 AD, a large number of people migrated to this area from the southern Kantō region, forming numerous fortified settlements. The name of “Shikama-saku” appears in Nara period records dated 737 AD as one of these settlements. The site was discovered and partially excavated in 1955 during an excavation survey of the ruins of the Nagiri Valley abandoned temple one kilometer east. More extensive investigations in 1977 led to the National Historic Site designation in 1979.

== Description ==
The ruins are located on a plateau at the southeast end of the Tamazuki-Kami Hills, extending from the Ōu Mountains towards the Osaki plains of northern Miyagi Prefecture. The site has always been “known”, as Edo period maps indicate that fragments of its ramparts existed on three side.

The fortification was a square enclosure, approximately 350 meters east-west by 370 meters north-south, consisting of a 2.4 meter thick earthen rampart surmounted by a wooden palisade, and protected by a 3-4 meter wide dry moat. It is the smallest known jōsaku-style fortification. There was a large gate at the center of the northern wall, and the post holes and foundation stones from structures which once stood in the middle of the structure have been found, which included a granary with a large amount of carbonized rice. There was also a small temple ruin within the fortifications. Recovered artifacts included roof tiles, Haji ware, Sue ware, inkstands, nails and Jomon pottery.

The ruins were backfilled after excavation, and there is nothing to be seen at the site today except for a commemorative stone marker. The site is located approximately 10 minutes by car from Nishi-Furukawa Station on the JR East Rikuu East Line.

== See also ==
- Emishi
- Taga Castle
- List of Historic Sites of Japan (Miyagi)
