= Kido Tile Kiln Site =

Archaeological site in Japan

Kido Tile Kiln ruins
- 木戸瓦窯跡 (Japanese)
- Kido Tile Kiln ruins Kido Tile Kiln Site (Japan)
- 38°37′17″N 141°02′25″E
- Periods: Nara to Heian period
- Location: Ōsaki, Miyagi, Japan
- Region: Tōhoku region

Site notes
- Public access: Yes (no facilities)

Kido Tile Kiln site (木戸瓦窯跡, Kido Kawara Kama-ato) is an archaeological site with the remains of a late Nara period, early Heian period kiln for roof tile production located in what is now the city of Ōsaki, Miyagi Prefecture in the Tōhoku region of northern Japan. It has been protected by the central government as a National Historic Site since 1976.

== See also ==
- List of Historic Sites of Japan (Miyagi)
- Daikichiyama Tile Kiln Site
- Hinodeyama Tile Kiln Site
