= Urushizawa Dam =

Dam in Miyagi Prefecture, Japan

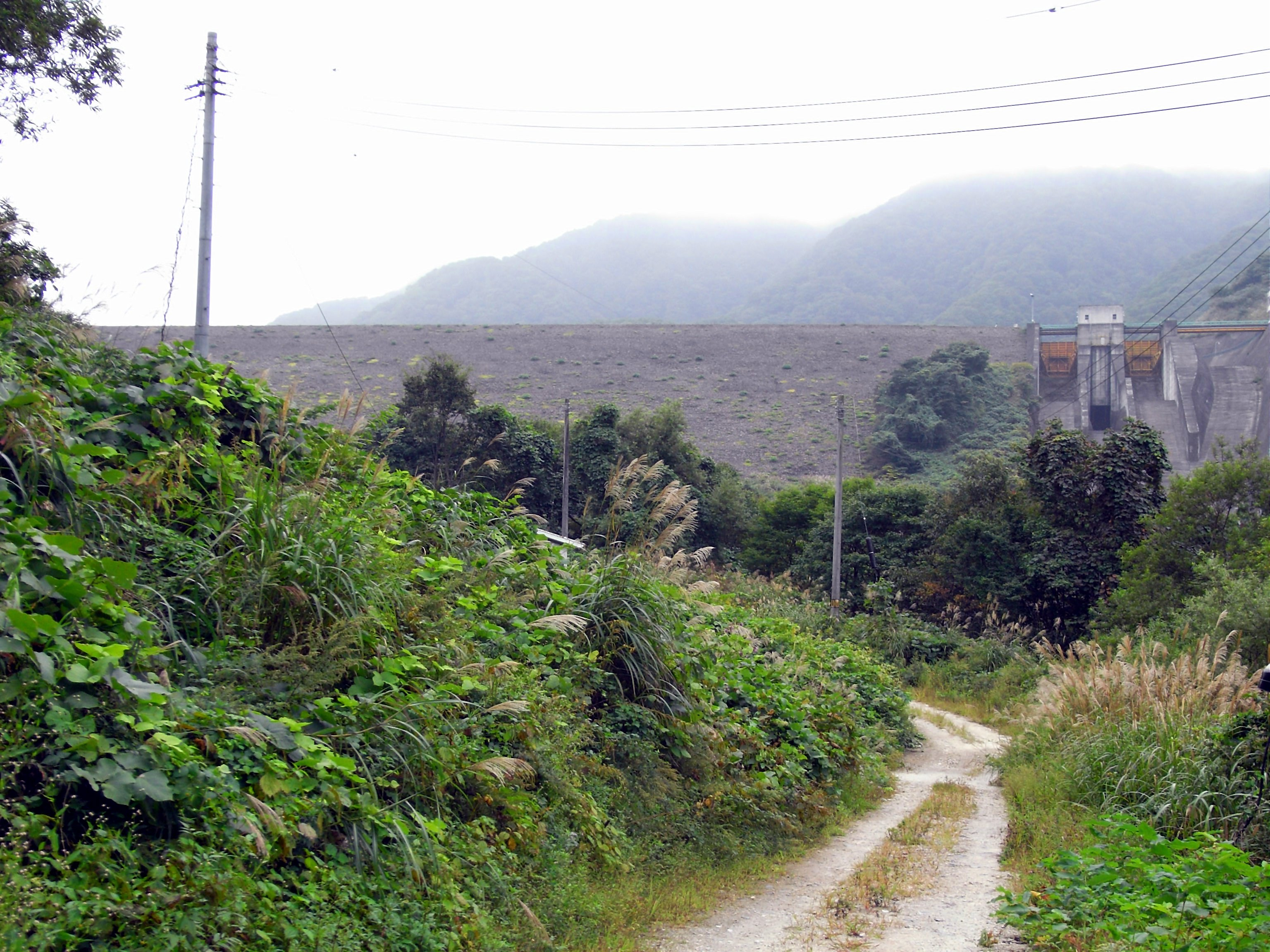
- Urushizawa Dam

- Location within Miyagi Prefecture Location within Japan
- Official name: 漆沢ダム
- Location: Kami, Miyagi, Japan
- Coordinates: 38°34′14.0″N 140°38′29″E
- Construction began: 1970
- Opening date: 1981
- Owner: Miyagi Prefecture

Dam and spillways
- Type of dam: central arch rockfall dam
- Impounds: Naruse River
- Height: 80.0 m (262.5 ft)
- Length: 310.0 m (1,017.1 ft)
- Dam volume: 2,200,000 m^{3}

Reservoir
- Creates: Lake Narugen
- Total capacity: 18,000,000 m^{3}
- Catchment area: 58.9 km^{2}
- Surface area: 83 hectares (210 acres)

Urushizawa Dam (漆沢ダム, Urushizawa damu) is multi-purpose dam on the Naruse River in the town of Kami, in Miyagi Prefecture, in the Tōhoku region of northern Japan. The dam was completed in 1980. The dam is used for flood control, irrigation, tap water, industrial water, and hydroelectric power generation.
