= Akai Kanga Ruins =

Archaeological site in Japan

- 赤井官衙遺跡群 (Japanese)
- Akai Kanga ruins ruins Akai Kanga Ruins (Japan)
- 38°25′44.1″N 141°11′48.84″E
- Periods: Asuka - Nara period
- Location: Higashimatsushima, Miyagi, Japan
- Region: Tōhoku region

History
- Built: 7th-9th century AD

Site notes
- Elevation: 27 m (89 ft)
- Public access: No

宮城県の行政地図情報システムにより、両遺跡の中心位置付近を表示。

The Akai Kanga ruins (赤井官衙遺跡群, Akai kanga iseki-gun) is an archaeological site with is a group of ruins related to the Oshika County government office of the ancient Mutsu Province, located in the area between Akai and Yamoto-Kamisawame neighborhoods in the city of Higashimatsushima, Miyagi in the Tōhoku region of Japan.. It consists of the Akai Kangai ruins, which served as the Oshika County Government Office and related fortifications (Oshika-saku), and the Yamoto Yokoana Kofun cluster (矢本横穴墓群), believed to be the burial site of local government official. The ruins were designated a National Historic Site in 2021.

== Overview ==
In the late Nara period, after the establishment of a centralized government under the Ritsuryō system, local rule over the provinces was standardized under a kokufu (provincial capital), and each province was divided into smaller administrative districts, known as (郡, gun, kōri), composed of 2–20 townships in 715 AD. Each of the units had an administrative complex, or kanga (官衙遺跡) built on a semi-standardized layout based on contemporary Chinese design.

=== Akai Kanga ruins ===
The Akai Kangai ruins are located in the western Ishinomaki Plain, on a beach ridge approximately two meters above sea level along Ishinomaki Bay. It is a complex site with remains and artifacts from the late Jōmon to Heian periods. Full-scale archaeological excavation began in 1986, and as of 2024, an area of 30,000 square meters has been investigated.

The ancient settlement of Akai emerged in the 4th century during the early Kofun period as a small settlement of pit dwellings and post-hole buildings by local communities, and continued into the first half of the 7th century. While the pottery excavated is of local origin, there are also small amounts of Onitaka-type Haji ware, the type of which is the Onitaka site in Ichikawa, Chiba in the Kantō region, suggesting inter-regional exchange with the Kantō region. By the mid-7th century, during the Asuka period, Kantō-style Haji ware became the dominant pottery used in the settlements. Large-scale migration from the Kantō region occurred during the period, and settlement was composed of migrants coexisting with the local population. Furthermore, toward the end of the 7th century, settlements began to be surrounded by ditches and wooden walls, forming enclosed settlements, which are thought to be the early stages of fortifications. By the early 8th century, which corresponds to the end of the Asuka period and the beginning of the Nara period, the enclosed settlement was abandoned, and extensive redevelopment of the area took place. In addition to a large canal-like ditch over 200 meters long, a group of large raised buildings (storehouses) were erected at the western edge of the site, and large, post-hole buildings believed to have been the residences of influential figures were constructed in the central area. These are believed to have been the residences of officials, and the site took on the appearance of a standardize kanga government site. However, as of 2024, no remains of the central political building (government office) have been discovered. Additionally, a wooden wall has been found around the edge of the ruins, confirming its function as a fortress.

The entry for April 739 in the Shoku Nihongi mentions the construction of five fortified castles in Mutsu Province: Oshika-saku, Iromashi-saku, Tamazukuri-saku, and Nitta-saku, as well as one other castle of unknown name (the "Tenpyo Five Fortifications"). The Akai ruins are thought to have served as both the Oshika County office and the Oshika-saku. These fortified castles and castles are believed to have been managed by the Michishima clan, descended from the Maruko clan, who were from eastern Kazusa Province. Michishima Shimatari rose to prominence through military exploits during the Fujiwara no Nakamaro Rebellion of 764, frequently appears in the Shoku Nihongi and Nihon Koki, and participated in battles against the Emishi. The buildings were rebuilt and reconstructed despite several fires from the mid-7th century to the early 9th century, a time frame which overlaps with the period in which the Michishima clan's activities are confirmed in these historical documents. However, with the end of the Emishi campaign in the early 9th century, the site fell into decline and fell into disuse, eventually coming to an end.

=== Yamoto Yokoaka Kofun cluster ===
The Yamoto Yokoaka Kofun cluster is a group of yokoanabo (横穴墓), tunnel tombs in artificial caves, on an east-facing tuff cliff located approximately five kilometers southwest of the Akai Kanga ruins. A total of 113 tombs have been confirmed, spread across a 1.5-kilometer stretch of the slope. Excavations to date have revealed that the chamber structure is very similar to the "kodanshikiyokoanabo" (high-level tunnel tombs) found in the eastern part of the Kazusa region of Chiba Prefecture, and that government office-related artifacts such as a decorated sword, a leather belt used by officials, and pottery with ink inscriptions have been excavated as grave goods. Furthermore, since the period of construction began in the mid-7th century, during the period when large-scale immigrants from the Kantō region settled at the Akai ruins, and ended with the decline of the region in the 9th century, the Yamoto Yokoana is thought to be the burial site of the Michishima clan and other immigrants from eastern Chiba Prefecture who settled there with them.

The Akai Kanga ruins are approximately four kilometers north of Yamoto Station on the JR East Senseki Line.

== See also ==
- List of Historic Sites of Japan (Miyagi)
