= Mutsu Kami Kaidō =

- 陸奥上街道 (Japanese)
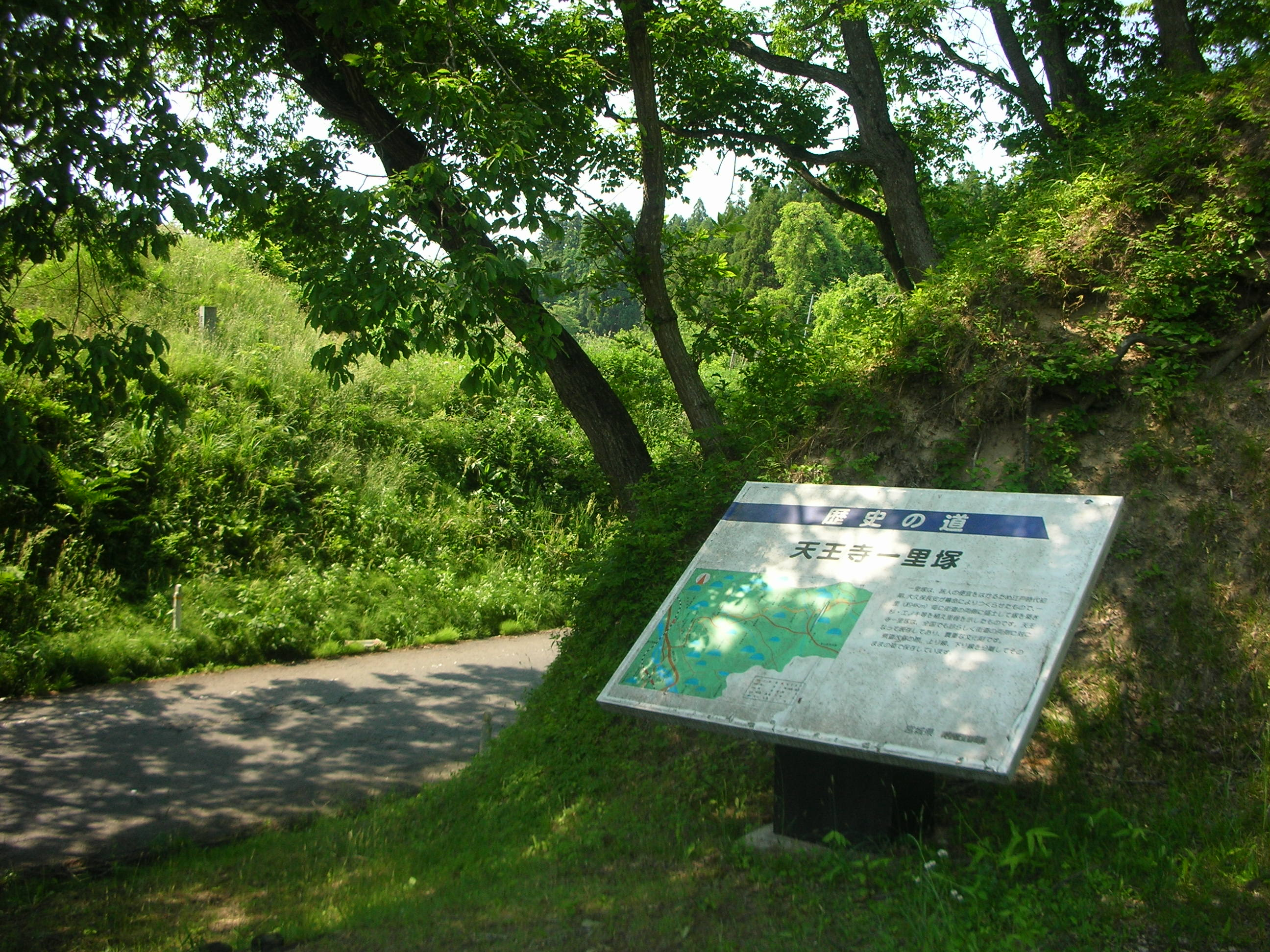
- Tennōji ichirizuka on the Mutsu Kami Kaidō in Ōsaki, Miyagi

- Mutsu Kami Kaidō Mutsu Kami Kaidō (Japan)
- 38°40′51″N 140°52′06″E
- Type: highway
- Location: Ōsaki, Miyagi, Japan
- Region: Tōhoku region

Site notes
- Excavation dates: 1978-1982
- Public access: Yes

The Mutsu Kami Kaidō (陸奥上街道) is an ancient highway in Mutsu Province which connected the Ōshū Kaidō to the Dewa Kaidō in the Tōhoku region of northern Japan. A surviving portion of the ancient road in the city of Ōsaki, Miyagi has been protected as a National Historic Site since 1990.

== Overview ==
The Mutsu Kami Kaidō extended from what is now Hiraizumi, Iwate through Ichinoseki, and Kurihara and Ōsaki in Miyagi Prefecture. The origin of the road is unknown; however, it was mentioned in the Kamakura period Azuma Kagami as the route taken by Minamoto no Yoritomo during his invasion of Ōshū in 1189 to destroy the Northern Fujiwara. It is also famous as the route that the Edo Period poet Basho took on his return from visiting the ruins of Hiraizumi. It was formerly also called the "Matsuyama-dō"

The National Historic Site designation covers a 2.8-kilometer (1.7 mi) stretch of the route in the former town of Iwadeyama, including a 1,500-meter (4,900 ft) stretch which is lined with pine trees on both sides. The Miyagi Prefectural Board of Education conducted a survey on this highway over four years from 1978 to 1982. The route has been repaired with numerous explanatory placards, and includes a surviving pair of ichirizuka mounds. The site is located about 50 minutes on foot from Kaminome Station on the JR East Rikuu East Line.

== See also ==
- List of Historic Sites of Japan (Miyagi)
