= Daikichiyama Tile Kiln Site =

Archaeological site in Õsaki, Tohoku, Japan

Daikichiyama Tile Kiln ruins
- 大吉山瓦窯跡 (Japanese)
- Location in Japan Daikichiyama Tile Kiln Site (Japan)
- 38°37′23″N 140°55′17″E
- Periods: Nara to Heian period
- Location: Ōsaki, Miyagi, Japan
- Region: Tōhoku region

Site notes
- Public access: Yes (no facilities)

The Daikichiyama Tile Kiln ruin (大吉山瓦窯跡, Daikichiyama Kawara Kama-ato) is an archaeological site with the remains of a late Nara period to early Heian period roof tile production site located in what is now the city of Ōsaki, Miyagi Prefecture in the Tōhoku region of northern Japan. It has been protected by the central government as a National Historic Site since 1976.

== Overview ==
As the imperial government extended control over Mutsu Province in the 8th Century AD, a number of fortified administrative centers and Buddhist temples were built in the area centered on Taga Castle. One feature of the buildings in these structures was the use of tiled roofs, which was a symbol of continental culture and the advanced state of the central administration. The Daikichiyama Kilns are one of several kilns which have been found within what is now Miyagi Prefecture dating from this period. These kilns were located in hilly land, near the sources of clay and fuel for the kilns. From the design patterns on shards found at the site, it was determined that the tiles from the kilns were used at Taga Castle, over 40 kilometers to the south, among other areas.

The site is located on the eastern slope of a hill about 50 meters in height, and consists of perhaps five kilns. The kilns are built underground into the slope of a hill, and are a stepless form of the traditional anagama kiln. The site has not been excavated in detail. Various styles of roof tiles have been recovered from the site, including cylindrical, flat, arch-shaped, and parts of a demon-shaped end tile. These are identical to tiles found at the site of Taga Castle, indicating that this was an official kiln of Mutsu Province.

The site was backfilled after excavation and is now a tree-covered hill with a stone monument marking the location. The site is about 25 minutes by car from Furukawa Station on the Tohoku Shinkansen.

== See also ==
- List of Historic Sites of Japan (Miyagi)
- Hinodeyama Tile Kiln Site
- Kido Tile Kiln Site
