= Nakazawame Shell Mound =

Archaeological site in Japan

Nakazawame Shell Midden
- 中沢目貝塚 (Japanese)
- Location in Japan Nakazawame Shell Mound (Japan)
- 38°36′6.78″N 141°08′38.44″E
- Type: shell midden
- Periods: Jōmon period
- Location: Ōsaki, Miyagi, Japan
- Region: Tōhoku region

Site notes
- Elevation: 29 m (95 ft)
- Length: 270 m (890 ft)
- Width: 220 m (720 ft)
- Public access: Yes (no facilities)

The Nakazawame Shell Midden (中沢目貝塚, Nakazawame Kaizuka) is an archaeological site consisting of a shell midden and the remains of an adjacent Jōmon period settlement located in what is now the city of Ōsaki, Miyagi Prefecture in the Tōhoku region of northern Japan. It has been protected by the central government as a National Historic Site since 1988.

== Overview ==
During the early to middle Jōmon period (approximately 4000 to 2500 BC), sea levels were five to six meters higher than at present, and the ambient temperature was also 2 deg C higher. During this period, the Tōhoku region was inhabited by the Jōmon people, many of whom lived in coastal settlements. The middens associated with such settlements contain bone, botanical material, mollusc shells, sherds, lithics, and other artifacts and ecofacts associated with the now-vanished inhabitants, and these features, provide a useful source into the diets and habits of Jōmon society.

Most of these middens are found along the Pacific coast of Japan, and the rocky ria coast of Miyagi Prefecture was densely settled from the early through late Jōmon period. However, the Nakazawame Shell Midden is located in an inland region well over 40 kilometers from the coast.

The site is located on a hill with an elevation of approximately twenty-nine metres above the Kitakami River and its tributary, the Hama River. The midden is large, extending for 270 meters east-west and 220 meters north-south, indicating continuous usage over thousands of years. A preliminary survey was conducted in 1974 by Tōhoku University, during which time freshwater shells and fish bones(mostly from carp, eel, and loach. giant snails, and mussels). provided insight into the diet of inland Jōmon peoples. In addition numerous artifacts of earthenware, clay figurines, as well as bone fishhooks and bone combs and ornaments were uncovered. Some of the artifacts discovered were made from materials found in the Ōu Mountains, indicating a network of long-distance trade existed in the Jōmon period. A further excavation in 1980 revealed the foundations of three pit dwellings.

The site was backfilled after excavation, and there is now nothing to se at the site except for a monument and plaque. The site is located bout 20 minutes by car from Tajiri Station on the JR East Tōhoku Main Line.

== See also ==
- List of Historic Sites of Japan (Miyagi)
- Nakane Shell Mound
