= Former Arikabe-juku Honjin =

Arakabejuku Honjin
- 旧有壁宿本陣
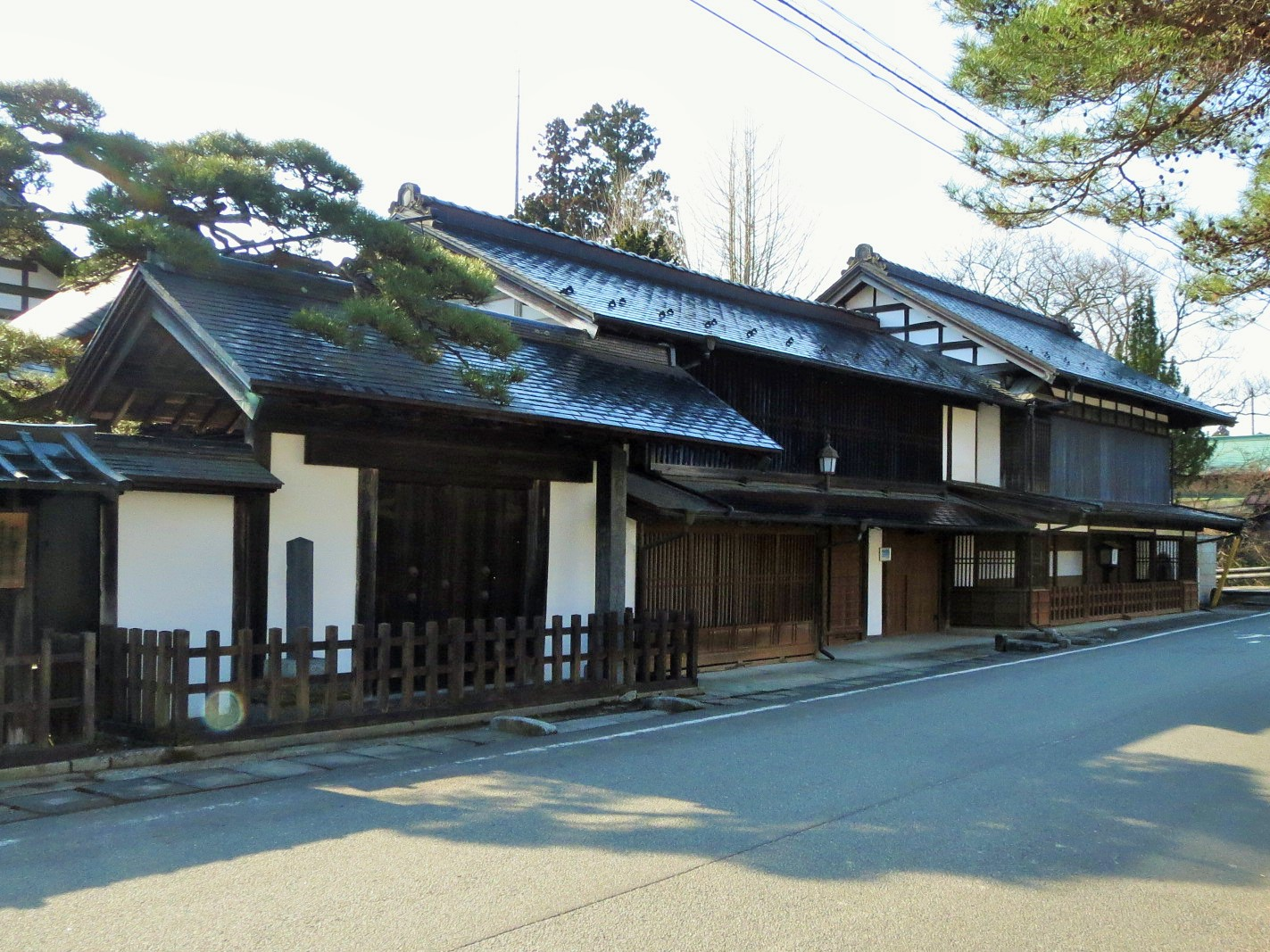
- Former Arakabejuku Honjin, March 2019

- Location within Miyagi Prefecture Former Arikabe-juku Honjin (Japan)

General information
- Location: Kurihara, Miyagi Prefecture, Japan
- Coordinates: 38°52′4.6″N 141°07′31.5″E

The Former Arakabejuku Honjin (旧有壁宿本陣, Kyu-Arakabejuku honjin) is a former honjin on the Ōshū Kaidō highway connecting Edo with northern Mutsu Province in the Tōhoku region of Japan. It is located in what is now part of the city of Kurihara in Miyagi Prefecture. The site was given protection as a National National Historic Site in May 1971.

== Overview ==
The Ōshū Kaidō was one of the five routes of the Edo period and was built to connect Edo (modern-day Tokyo) with Mutsu Province and the present-day city of Shirakawa, Fukushima Prefecture, and points further north to Ezo. As with the other Kaidō, post stations where travelers could rest on their journey were established at regular intervals.

Arakabe was established as one of the five shukuba on the Ōshū Kaidō by the Tokugawa shogunate in 1619, and the large residence of the Satō clan, who had served as generation of village headmen, received the designation of honjin. The daimyō of Matsumae, Hachinohe, Morioka and Ichinoseki Domains used this honjin during their sankin kōtai processions to-and-from Edo. Several repairs were made over the years, including changing the roof from its original thatch to roof tiles; however, the gate, Kura and other minor structures remained unchanged. The original honjin burned down in 1744 and the present structure dates from that reconstruction.

After the Meiji restoration, Emperor Meiji made two official visits to the Tōhoku region and stayed at the Arakebejuku honjin in 1876 and in 1881. Since those visits, the main gate of the honjin has been permanently closed. The interior of the building is closed to the public but houses important historical materials that convey aspects of the Edo period and the management of the inn station,

The Former Arakabejuku Honjin is located approximately 15 minutes by car from Tohoku Expressway Wakayanagi Kanari IC.

== See also ==
- List of Historic Sites of Japan (Miyagi)
