= Iji Castle =

Japanese castle

- 伊治城
- Kurihara, Miyagi Prefecture, Japan

Site information
- Type: jōsaku-style Japanese castle
- Open to the public: Yes (no public facilities)
- Condition: ruins

Location
- Iji Castle Iji Castle (Japan)
- Coordinates: 38°45′51″N 140°54′52″E

Site history
- Built: 767 AD
- Demolished: 780 AD

Iji Castle (伊治城, Iji-jō) was jōsaku-style Japanese castle built during late Nara period. Its ruins are now an archaeological site in the city of Kurihara, Miyagi prefecture in the Tōhoku region of northern Japan. The site has been protected as a National Historic Site on August 27, 2003.

The actual pronunciation of the name of this fortification remains uncertain, as the kanji of its name can also be read as "Koreharu Castle".

== Background ==
In the late Nara period, after the establishment of a centralized government under the Ritsuryō system, the imperial court sent a number of military expeditions to what is now the Tōhoku region of northern Japan to bring the local Emishi tribes under its control. After the establishment of Taga Castle on the Pacific coast, Yamato forces gradually pushed into the hinterland of what is now Miyagi Prefecture, establishing several fortified settlements against increasing Emishi opposition. A fort was built on this site in 767 AD, which is approximately 50 kilometers north of Taga Castle. This became the center of a settlement which had over 2500 peasants, many of whom were settlers brought from other parts of Japan.

During the Hōki era (770-781), a widespread rebellion by the Emishi against the Yamato invaders erupted in the Kitakami River valley. Yamato forces lost several battles and a large counter-offensive in 776 AD failed. By 780 AD, the Emishi had advanced to the Sendai plains, even destroying settlements to the south of Iji Castle. In May 780, the Chinjufu-shōgun Ki no Hirozumi established his headquarters at Iji Castle in preparation for a new offensive intended to cut off the Emishi invasion. However, a senior Emishi officer in the Yamato army, Iji no Kimi Azamaro (whose name could also possibly be read as "Koreharu no Kimi Azamaro") killed the general along with the inspector of Oshiki District, Ōdate Michishima at Iji Castle and rose in revolt. A few days later, he attacked Taga Castle itself, which he plundered and burned.

Iji no Azamaro was an Emishi who had received the unprecedented court rank of Junior Fourth Rank, which made him an aristocrat. The Shoku Nihongi records that he was frequently insulted by Ōdate Michishima because of his background.

Iji Castle survived the uprising, and per 796 AD records, the surrounding area had been resettled by 5000 peasants from Dewa and Echigo Provinces. It is not known when the castle was abandoned.

== Description ==
The ruins are located near the center of the former town of Tsukidate within Kurihara city. The fort consisted of a rectangular enclosure, approximately 700 meters east-west by 900 meters north-south, consisting of a two-meter high earthen rampart surmounted by a wooden palisade, and protected by a dry moat. The moat had a width of ten meters and depth of up to four meters. There were a total of twelve gates in the walls, with the largest at the center of the southern wall. Post holes, foundation stones and fragments of roof tiles from structures which presumably once stood in the middle of the enclosure, along with fragments of weapons have been found. Pottery from pit dwellings in the surrounding area date from the latter half of the 8th century to the beginning of the 9th century.

The ruins were backfilled after excavation, and there is nothing to be seen at the site today except for a commemorative signpost. Japan National Route 4 cuts through the site diagonally. The site is approximately 18 minutes by car from JR East Tohoku Shinkansen Kurikoma-Kogen Station.

== See also ==
- Emishi
- Taga Castle
- List of Historic Sites of Japan (Miyagi)
