= Yamahata Cave Tomb Cluster =

Archaeological site in Osaki, Japan

Yamahata Yokoana Tomb Cluster
- 山畑横穴群 (Japanese)
- Location in Japan Yamahata Cave Tomb Cluster (Japan)
- 38°31′15″N 140°55′34″E
- Type: necropolis
- Periods: Kofun period
- Location: Ōsaki, Miyagi, Japan
- Region: Tōhoku region

Site notes
- Excavation dates: 1972
- Public access: Yes (no public facilities)

The Yamahata Cave Tomb Cluster (山畑横穴群, Yamahata Yokoana-gun) is an archaeological site with a cluster of 6th century AD yokoanabo located in what is now the city of Ōsaki, Miyagi Prefecture in the Tōhoku region of northern Japan. The site has been protected by the central government as a National Historic Site since 1973.

== Overview ==
The site is located on the southern slope of a tuff hill, and consists of 26 tombs, of which 23 were excavated in 1972. The tombs have various styles of ceilings, some of which are gabled or arched, and some of the tombs have a finished floor. Of note are Tombs 6, 10 and 15, which were found to contain concentric and lattice patterned decorations in red paint, and are the furthest north examples of decorated tombs which have yet been discovered.

Artifacts discovered included clay vessel shards, Sue pottery, fragments of metal implements or swords, all of which date the tombs to the late 6th century in the late Kofun period through early Nara period, although some of the tombs appear to have re-used in the 9th century.

The tombs were backfilled for preservation except for Tomb 15, which was preserved as part of a museum exhibition, along with the excavated items.

== See also ==
- List of Historic Sites of Japan (Miyagi)
