= Numazu Shell Mound =

Numazu Shell Midden
- 沼津貝塚 (Japanese)
- Location in Japan Numazu Shell Mound (Japan)
- 38°26′44.9″N 141°22′39.5″E
- Type: shell midden
- Periods: Jōmon period
- Location: Ishinomaki, Miyagi, Japan
- Region: Tōhoku region

Site notes
- Elevation: 25 m (82 ft)
- Height: 15 m (49 ft)
- Length: 220 m (720 ft)
- Width: 160 m (520 ft)
- Public access: Yes (no facilities)

Numazu Shell Midden (沼津貝塚, Numazu Kaizuka) is an archaeological site consisting of a Jōmon period shell midden and the remains of an adjacent settlement located in what is now the city of Ishinomaki, Miyagi Prefecture in the Tōhoku region of northern Japan. It has been protected by the central government as a National Historic Site since 1972.

== Overview ==
During the early to middle Jōmon period (approximately 4000 to 2500 BC), sea levels were five to six meters higher than at present, and the ambient temperature was also 2 deg C higher. During this period, the Tōhoku region was inhabited by the Jōmon people, many of whom lived in coastal settlements. The middens associated with such settlements contain bone, botanical material, mollusc shells, sherds, lithics, and other artifacts and ecofacts associated with the now-vanished inhabitants, and these features, provide a useful source into the diets and habits of Jōmon society.

Most of these middens are found along the Pacific coast of Japan, and the rocky ria coast of Miyagi Prefecture was densely settled from the early through late Jōmon period. The Numazu Shell Midden is located east of the modern city, near Mankoku Bay, at an elevation of approximately twenty-five meters from the present-day coastline. The midden is very large, extending for 220 meters east-west and 160 meters north-south, with a height of approximately 15 meters, indicating continuous usage over thousands of years. This is also reflected in the composition of the shells within the midden, changing from seawater clams to freshwater clams depending on the changes in the sea level.

A preliminary survey was conducted intermittently from 1908 to 1929 by local authorities, during which time over 1200 artifacts such as bone tools and ornaments, along with Jōmon-period pottery and two terracotta animal figurines. A major feature of the excavated artifacts are hooks and harpoons made from deer horse, which are important data for studying fishing activities during the Jōmon period. The excavated items are now stored at the Tōhoku University, and 473 have been collectively designated as a national Important Cultural Property in 1963.

More comprehensive excavations were conducted in 1958, 1963 and 1967; however the site did not receive protection until it was designated as a national historic site in 1972. The site was backfilled after excavations, and there is nothing to see at present but an empty field with a stone monument. The site is about 20 minutes by car from Ishinomaki Station on the JR East Senseki Line.

== See also ==
- List of Historic Sites of Japan (Miyagi)
