= Shikama, Miyagi =

Shikama 色麻町
- Town
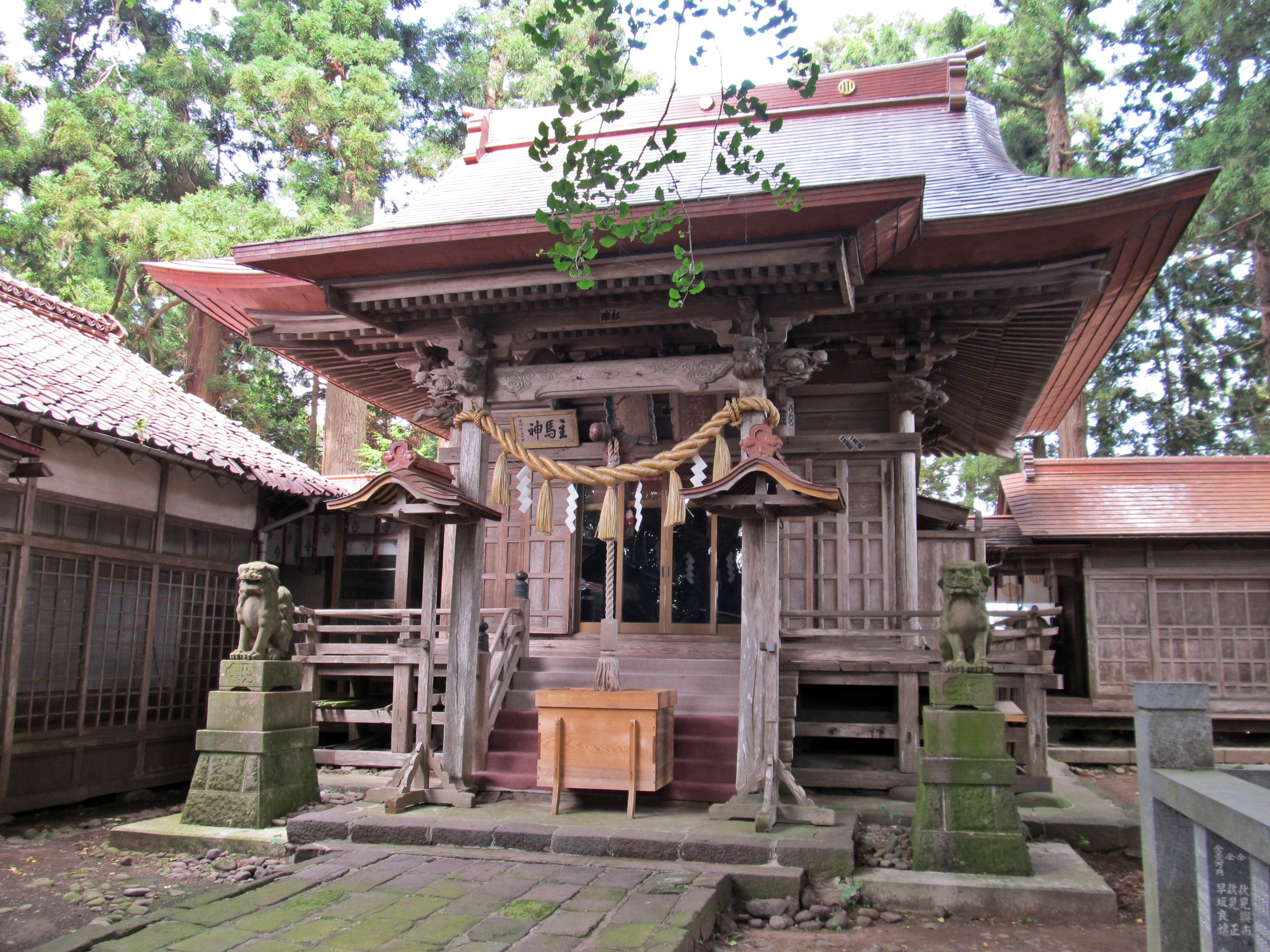
- Haiden of Idate Jinja in Shikama

- Flag Seal

- Location of Shikama in Miyagi Prefecture

- Coordinates: 38°32′51.6″N 140°50′59.6″E
- Country: Japan
- Region: Tōhoku
- Prefecture: Miyagi
- District: Kami

Area
  - Total: 109.28 km^{2} (42.19 sq mi)

Population (May 31, 2020)
  - Total: 6,723
  - Density: 61.52/km^{2} (159.3/sq mi)
- Time zone: UTC+09:00 (Japan Standard Time)
- Tree: Sakura
- Phone number: 0229-65-2111
- Address: 41 Yotsugama Kitatani, Shikama-chō, Kami-gun, Miyagi-ken 981-4122
- Website: Official website

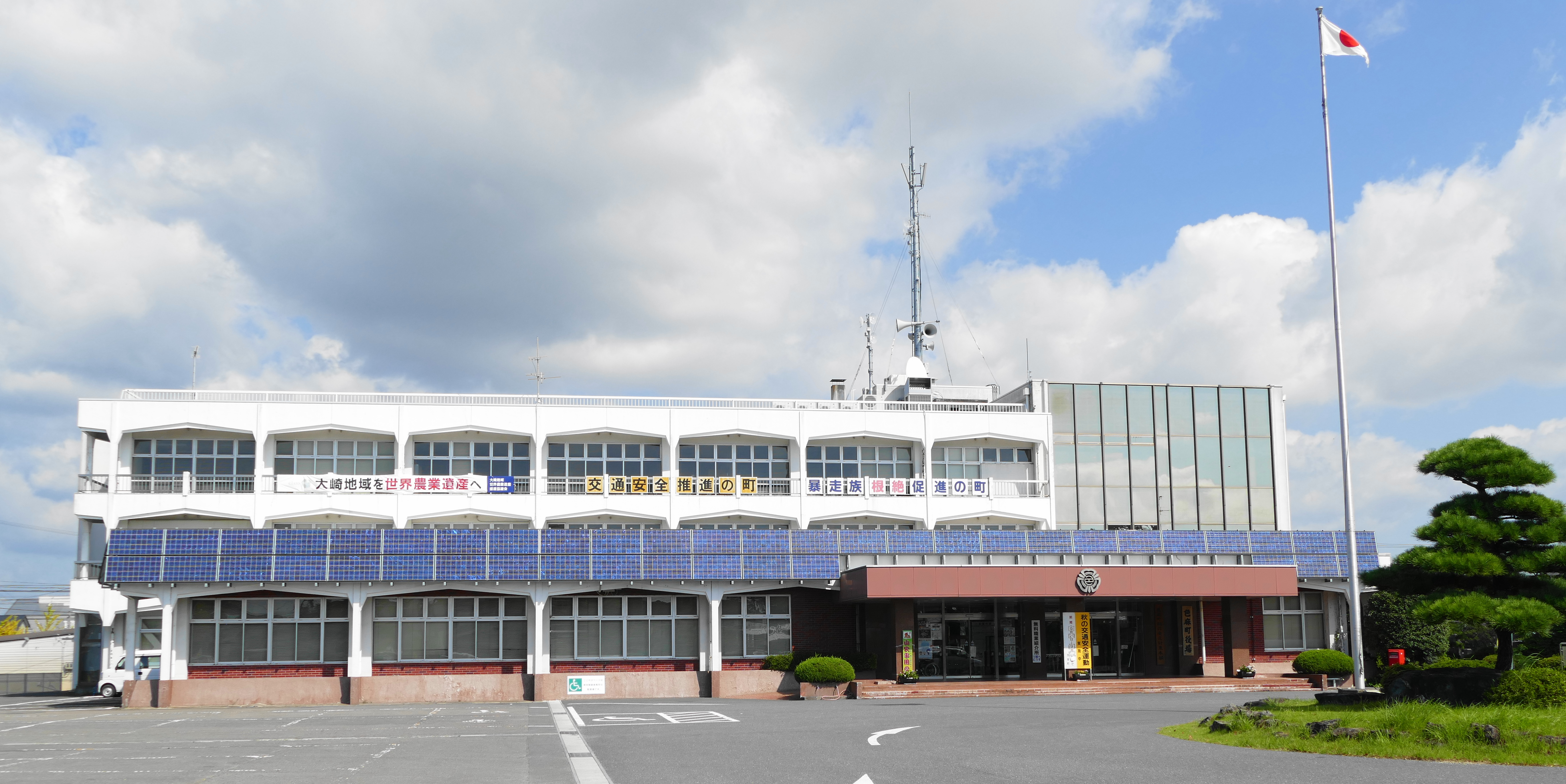
Shikama Town Hall

Shikama (色麻町, Shikama-chō) is a town located in Miyagi Prefecture, Japan. As of 31 May 2020, the town had an estimated population of 6,723, and a population density of 62 persons per km^{2} in 20961 households. The total area of the town is 109.28 square kilometres (42.19 sq mi).

== Geography ==
Shikama is located in west-central Miyagi Prefecture, bordered by the Ōu Mountains to the west. Parts of the town are within the borders of the Funagata Renpō Prefectural Natural Park.

=== Neighboring municipalities ===
Miyagi Prefecture

- Kami
- Ōhira
- Ōsaki
- Sendai
- Taiwa

Yamagata Prefecture

- Obanazawa

=== Climate ===
The town has a climate characterized by cool summers and cold winters (Köppen climate classification Cfa). The average annual temperature in Shikama is 11.0 °C. The average annual rainfall is 1342 mm with September as the wettest month. The temperatures are highest on average in August, at around 24.2 °C, and lowest in January, at around -1.2 °C.

== Demographics ==
Per Japanese census data, the population of Shikama has declined over the past 60 years.

Historical population
Year	Pop.	±%
1920	5,985	—
1930	6,832	+14.2%
1940	7,599	+11.2%
1950	9,881	+30.0%
1960	10,040	+1.6%
1970	8,836	−12.0%
1980	8,865	+0.3%
1990	8,717	−1.7%
2000	8,162	−6.4%
2010	7,431	−9.0%
2020	6,698	−9.9%

== History ==
The area of present-day Shikama was part of ancient Mutsu Province, and has been settled since at least the Jōmon period by the Emishi people. Per the Shoku Nihongi, following a huge earthquake in the year 715 AD, a large number of people migrated to this area from the southern Kantō region, forming numerous fortified settlements. The name of “Shikama-saku” appears in Nara period records dated 737 AD as one of these settlements. During the Sengoku period, the area was contested by various samurai clans before the area came under the control of the Date clan of Sendai Domain during the Edo period, under the Tokugawa shogunate.

The village of Shikama was created on April 1, 1889, with the establishment of the modern municipalities system. Shikama was raised to town status on April 1, 1978. A motion to merger with the neighboring three towns of Miyazaki, Nakaniida, and Onoda, all from Kami District, was defeated by a local referendum in April 2003.

== Government ==
Shikama has a mayor-council form of government with a directly elected mayor and a unicameral town council of 13 members. Shikama, together with the rest of Kami District collectively contributes one seat to the Miyagi Prefectural legislature. In terms of national politics, the town is part of Miyagi 4th district of the lower house of the Diet of Japan.

== Economy ==
The economy of Shikama is largely based on agriculture, primarily the cultivation of rice and Egoma.

== Education ==
Shikama has one public elementary school and one public junior high school operated by the town government, and one public high school operated by the Miyagi Prefectural Board of Education.

== Transportation ==
=== Railway ===
- Shikama does not have any passenger railway service.

=== Highway ===
- National Route 457

== Noted people from Shikama ==
- Susumu Ojima, entrepreneur
