= Kami, Miyagi =

Kami 加美町
- Town
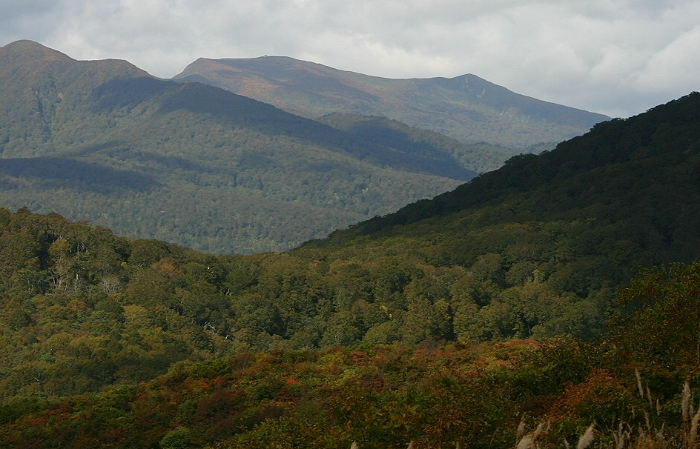
- Mount Funagata

- Flag Seal

- Location of Kami in Miyagi Prefecture

- Coordinates: 38°34′18.3″N 141°51′17.3″E
- Country: Japan
- Region: Tōhoku
- Prefecture: Miyagi
- District: Kami

Area
  - Total: 460.67 km^{2} (177.87 sq mi)

Population (May 2020)
  - Total: 22,804
  - Density: 49.502/km^{2} (128.21/sq mi)
- Time zone: UTC+9 (Japan Standard Time)
- City symbols
  - Tree: Siebold’s beech
  - Flower: Asian skunk cabbage
  - Bird: Green pheasant
  - Fish: Ayu
- Phone number: 0229-63-3111
- Address: 3-5 Nishida, Kami-chō, Kami-gun, Miyagi-ken 981-4292
- Website: Official website

Kami Town Hall

Kami (加美町, Kami-machi) is a town located in Miyagi Prefecture, Japan. As of 31 May 2020, the town had an estimated population of 22,804 and a population density of 50 persons per km^{2} in 8119 households. The total area of the town is 460.67 square kilometres (177.87 sq mi). .

== Geography ==
Kami is located in west-central Miyagi Prefecture, bordered by Yamagata Prefecture to the west. Parts of the town are within the borders of the Funagata Renpō Prefectural Natural Park.

=== Neighboring municipalities ===
Miyagi Prefecture

- Ōsaki
- Shikama

Yamagata Prefecture

- Mogami
- Obanazawa

=== Climate ===
The town has a climate characterized by cool summers and long cold winters (Köppen climate classification Cfa). The average annual temperature in Kami is 11.4 °C. The average annual rainfall is 1336 mm with September as the wettest month. The temperatures are highest on average in August, at around 24.6 °C, and lowest in January, at around -0.8 °C.

== Demographics ==
Per Japanese census data, the population of Kami has declined over the past 70 years.

Historical population
Year	Pop.	±%
1920	24,597	—
1930	28,484	+15.8%
1940	30,569	+7.3%
1950	37,895	+24.0%
1960	37,054	−2.2%
1970	31,693	−14.5%
1980	30,996	−2.2%
1990	30,184	−2.6%
2000	28,330	−6.1%
2010	25,527	−9.9%
2020	21,943	−14.0%

== History ==
The area of present-day Kami was part of ancient Mutsu Province, and has been settled since at least the Jōmon period by the Emishi people. Kami District is mentioned in early Nara period records. Per the Shoku Nihongi, following a huge earthquake in the year 715 AD, a large number of people migrated to this area from the southern Kantō region, forming numerous fortified settlements. During later portion of the Heian period, the area was ruled by the Northern Fujiwara. During the Sengoku period, the area was contested by various samurai clans before the area came under the control of the Date clan of Sendai Domain during the Edo period, under the Tokugawa shogunate. Following the Meiji restoration, the town of Nakaniida was established within Kami District, Miyagi with the creation of the modern municipalities system.

The town of Kami was created on April 1, 2003, as a result of a merger between three towns, Miyazaki, Nakaniida, and Onoda, all from Kami District.

== Government ==
Kami has a mayor-council form of government with a directly elected mayor and a unicameral town council of 18 members. Kami, together with the rest of Kami District collectively contributes one seat to the Miyagi Prefectural legislature. In terms of national politics, the town is part of Miyagi 4th district of the lower house of the Diet of Japan.

== Economy ==
The economy of Kami is largely based on agriculture, primarily the cultivation of rice.

== Education ==
Kami has nine public elementary schools and two public junior high schools, Miyazaki Junior Highschool and Onoda Junior Highschool combined in 2023 to become Meiho Junior Highschool, operated by the town government. The town has one public high school operated by the Miyagi Prefectural Board of Education.

== Transportation ==
=== Railway ===
- Kami does not have any passenger railway service.

=== Highway ===
- National Route 347
- National Route 457

== Local attractions ==
- Higashiyama Kanga ruins, Nara period ruins, National Historic Site
- Jō Palisade Site, ruins of Nara-period fortification; National Historic Site.
- Urushizawa Dam

== Noted people from Kami ==
- Mikio Igarashi, manga artist
