= Higashiyama Kanga ruins =

Ancient ruins in Kami, Tōhoku, Japan

Higashiyama Government office site
- 東山官衙遺跡 (Japanese)
- Higashiyama Government office site Higashiyama Kanga ruins (Japan)
- 38°35′56″N 140°48′12″E
- Periods: Nara to Heian period
- Location: Kami, Miyagi, Japan
- Region: Tōhoku region

History
- Built: 8th century AD
- Abandoned: 10th century AD

Site notes
- Length: 300 m (980 ft)
- Width: 250 m (820 ft)
- Public access: Yes (no facilities)

The Higashiyama Kanga ruins (東山官衙遺跡, Higashiyama Kangai iseki) is an archaeological site with ruins of a Nara period to early Heian period government administrative complex located in what is now part of the town of Kami in Kami District, Miyagi prefecture in the Tōhoku region of far northern Honshu, Japan. The site was proclaimed a National National Historic Site in January 1999.The site was excavated in 1986. It is roughly contemporary with Taga Castle to the southeast.

== Background ==
In the late Nara period, after the establishment of a centralized government under the Ritsuryō system, the imperial court sent a number of military expeditions to what is now the Tōhoku region of northern Japan to bring the local Emishi tribes under its control. Per the Shoku Nihongi, following a huge earthquake in the year 715 AD, a large number of people migrated to this area from the southern Kantō region, forming numerous fortified settlements.

== Description ==
The ruins are located on a plateau at the southeast end of a group of hills extending from the Ōu Mountains towards the Osaki plains of northern Miyagi Prefecture. The site consists of the remnants of a fortified square enclosure, approximately 300 meters east-west by 250 meters north-south, with an earthen rampart, presumably surmounted by a wooden palisade. Inside the outer enclosure was an inner enclosure protected by an earthen wall 57 meters east-west by 58 meters north-south, with post holes and foundation stones indicating the locations of political affairs and ceremonial buildings, and numerous granaries for storing tax rice. This was a typical layout for local government administrative complexes built per the dictates of the Ritsuryō administration. It was built in the middle of the first half of the 8th century and was abandoned in the middle of the 10th century.

The site was backfilled after excavation, and there is now nothing to be seen at the site today except for a commemorative stone marker .It is located about 30 minutes by car from Furukawa IC on the Tohoku Expressway.

== See also ==
- Taga Castle
- List of Historic Sites of Japan (Miyagi)
- Sanjusangendō Kanga ruins
