= Taga Castle =

Ruined castle in Miyagi, Japan

- 多賀城
- Tagajō, Miyagi Prefecture, Japan
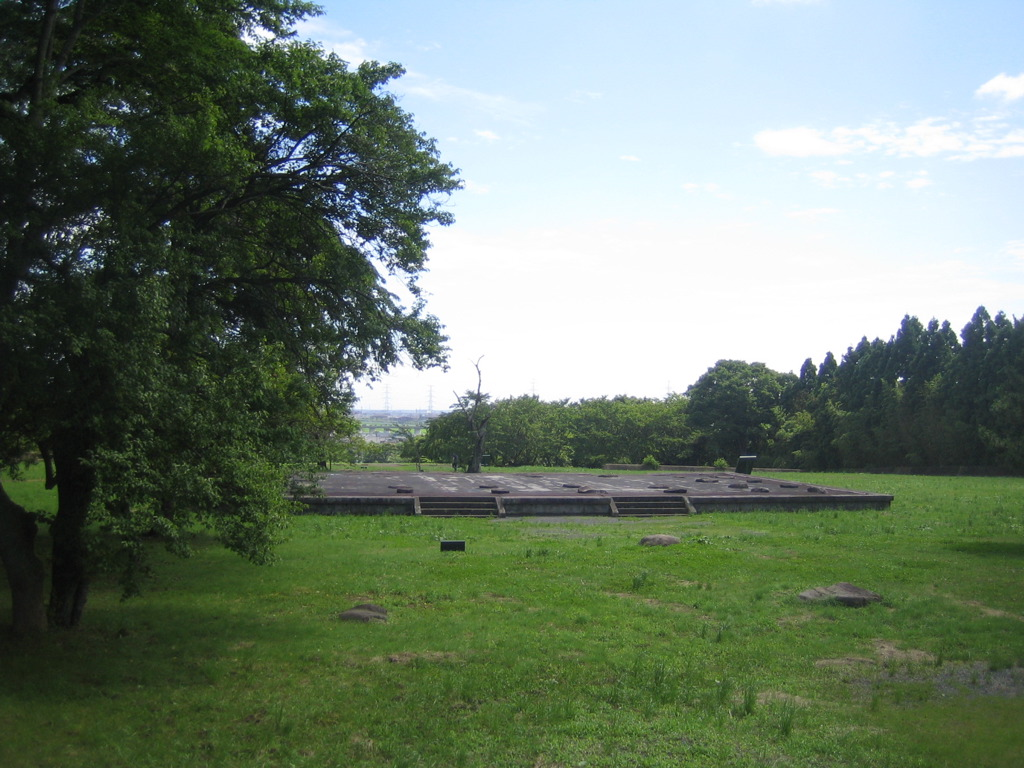
- Tagajo-ato seiden-2.JPG

Site information
- Type: jōsaku-style Japanese castle
- Open to the public: yes
- Condition: archaeological site

Location
- Taga Castle
- Location within Miyagi Prefecture Location within Japan
- Coordinates: 38°18′24″N 140°59′18″E

Site history
- Built: 724 AD
- Demolished: unknown

Taga Castle (多賀城, Taga-jō) was a jōsaku-style Japanese castle built in the late Nara period in what is now part of the city of Tagajō in Miyagi prefecture in the Tōhoku region of far northern Honshu, Japan. Bashō tells of his visit to the site in Oku no Hosomichi. The ruins of Taga-jō and its former temple have been designated a Special Historic Site (特別史跡) since 1922.

== History ==
In the Nara period, after the establishment of a centralized government under the Ritsuryō system, the imperial court sent a number of military expeditions to what is now the Tōhoku region of northern Japan to bring the local Emishi tribes under its control. In what is now Miyagi Prefecture, a civil administration was established in the form of a provincial capital and regional administrative centers in the late 6th century; however, a massive Emishi uprising occurred in 709 AD during which time many of these structures were destroyed. Per the Shoku Nihongi, following a huge earthquake in the year 715 AD, a large number of people migrated to this area from the southern Kantō region, forming numerous fortified settlements in the hinterland.

An inscription on a monument found at the site of Taga Castle gives a foundation date of 724 AD and states that it was constructed by Azumabito Ono as the provisional provincial capital of Mutsu Province. Along with Akita Castle and Okachi Fort in Dewa Province, it was one of the main bases for the Yamato re-expansion into northern Honshu. Its commander was titled Chinjufu-shōgun (鎮守府) and was the northern equivalent to the commander of Dazaifu (太宰府) in Kyushu. The castle was significantly renovated by Fujiwara Asakari in 762 AD.

Taga Castle was rebuilt after being sacked and burned by the Emishi in 780 AD. From 802 AD, the frontier between Yamato and Emishi territories shifted further north due to the successful campaigns of Sakanoue no Tamuramaro, and with the construction of Isawa Castle, Taga Castle gradually lost importance. It was retained as a center for administrative functions, but most military activities were transferred to various northern strongholds. It was badly damaged by the Jōgan tsunami of 869.

In 10th century, due to the collapse of ancient administrative system and rise of local samurai bands, the central government abandoned direct rule in favor of a feudal system of local warlords nominally under the control of various nobles in Kyoto. Taga Castle gradually fell into ruins, and rise of Hiraizumi under the Northern Fujiwara in the twelfth century saw its final demise. During the Nanboku-chō period, Kitabatake Chikafusa and his son Kitabatake Akiie briefly occupied the site for the Southern Court, but later moved to the more secure mountain fortress of Mount Ryōzen to the north. The site reverted to empty fields, and was not excavated until 1955, with more extensive investigations in 1976.

== Description ==
Taga Castle is more of a fortified city than a military stronghold. It is located on a plateau 10 kilometer northeast of Sendai city near the Pacific coast. This area is a hill country which divides the Sendai Plain into half and which was close to Shiogama, a natural port which was also used during this era. The site was surrounded by a marsh and rivers, making it an appropriate place for defense.

The fortification was a square enclosure, approximately 3.4 kilometers in perimeter, consisting of a 5-meter high earthen rampart surmounted by a wooden palisade, and protected by a 3-4 meter wide dry moat. The east side of the castle facing the connecting hills was especially well-protected, and an east side gate was built inside the hollow of the wall, guarded by a corner turret. Within the fortified main gate in the south was a main road of over 20 meters in width leading to a second square enclosure, 100 meter square, also with earthen walls. The outer area contained administrative offices, barracks and the residences of officers, while the inner area contained the higher government administrative buildings, workshops and storehouses.

About a kilometer south of the Taga Castle ruins are the ruins of a large Buddhist temple complex, and outside the southern wall of the castle are the ruins of a planned settlement.

The site today is maintained as an archaeological park. Taga Castle was listed as one of the 100 Fine Castles of Japan by the Japan Castle Foundation in 2006.

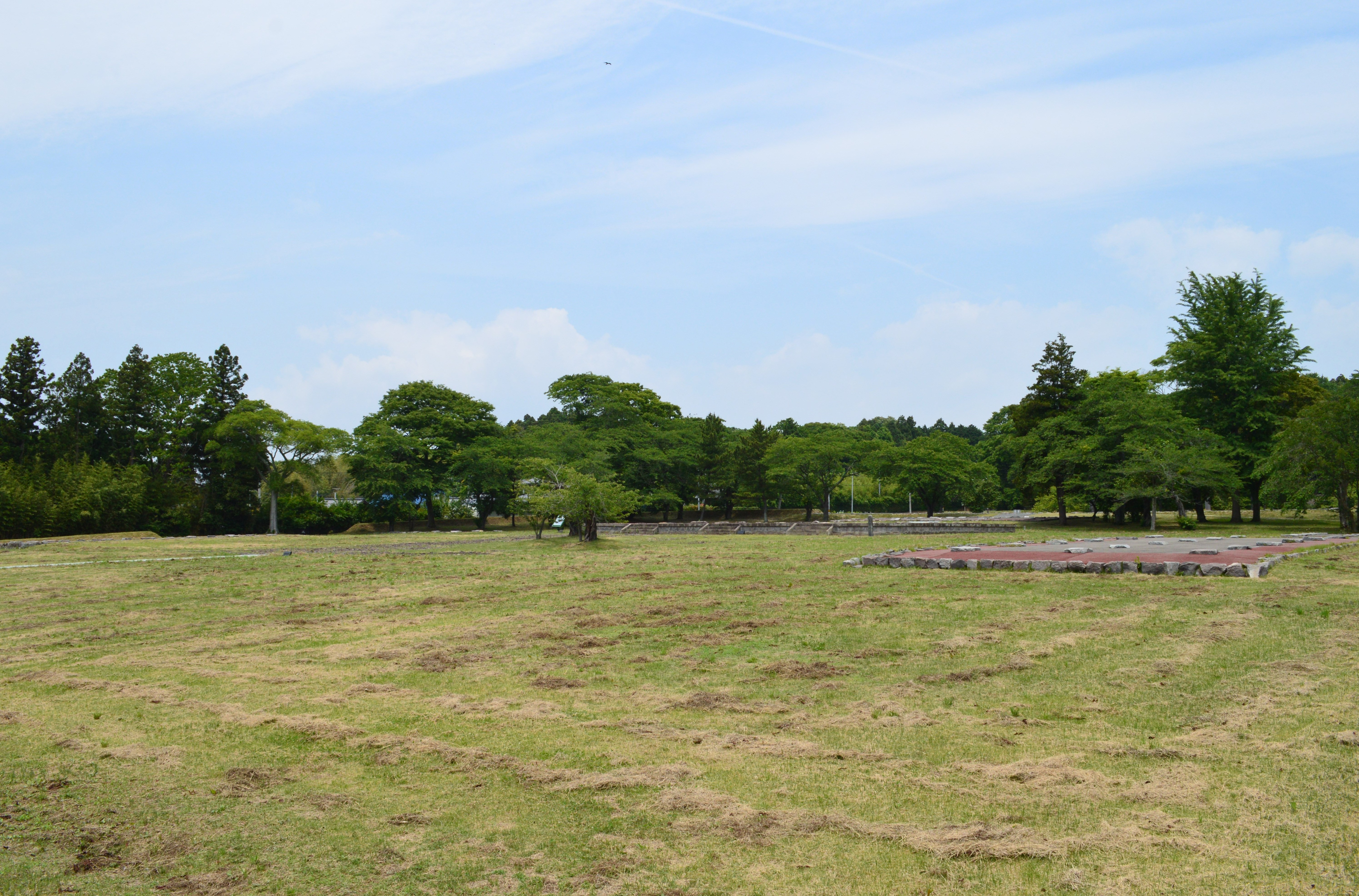
Panorama

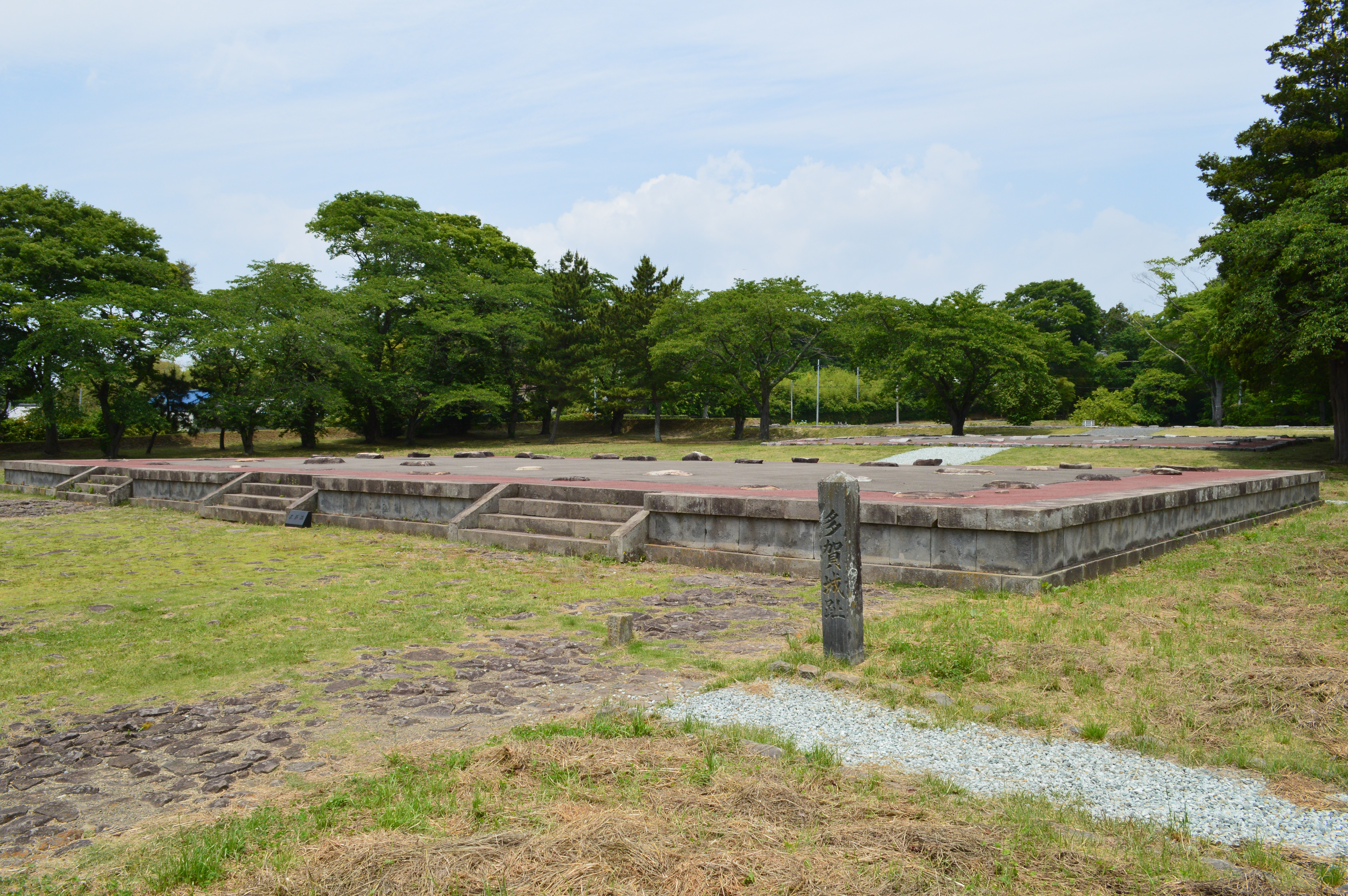
Site of the Front Palace

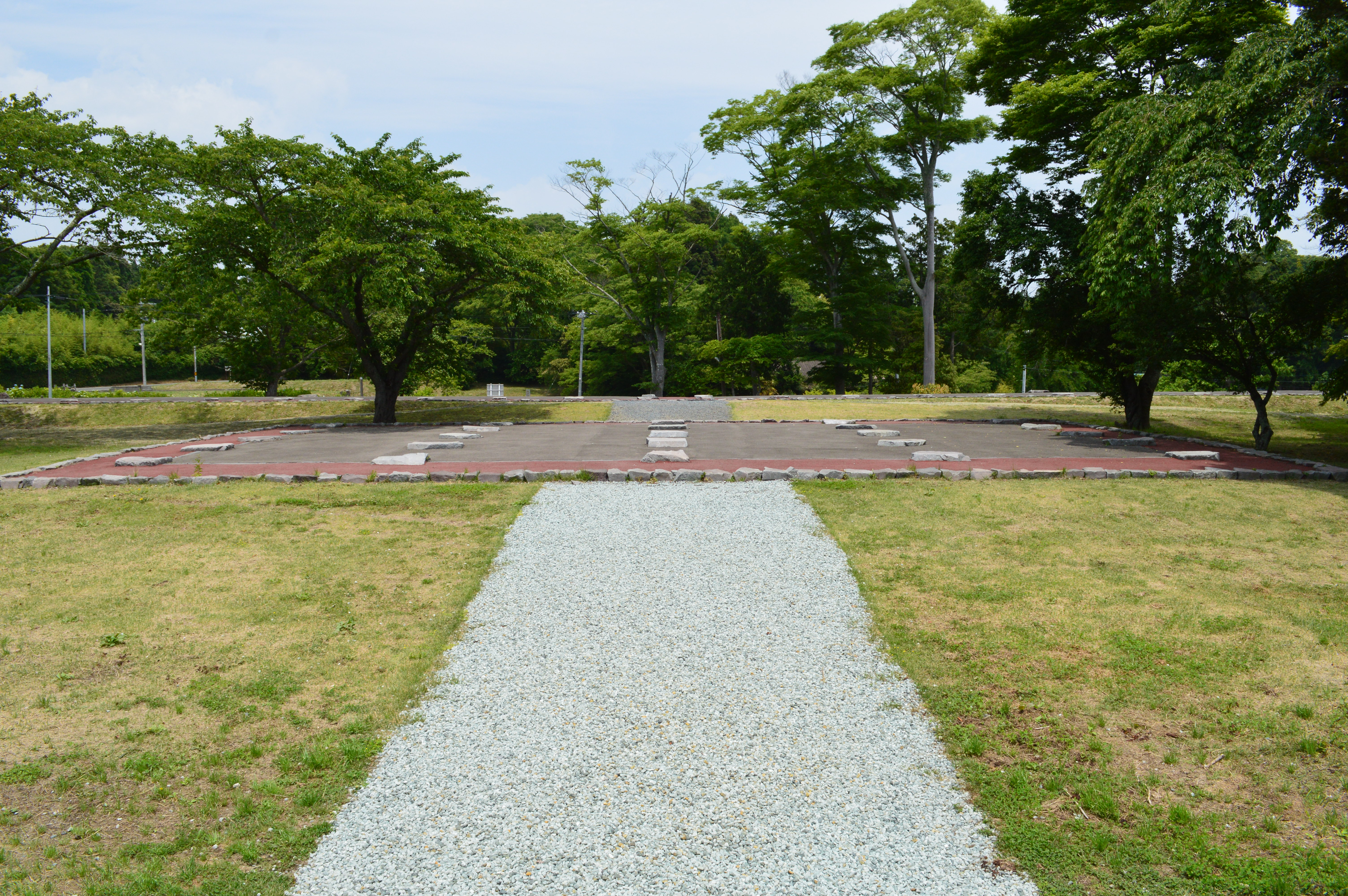
Site of the Rear Palace

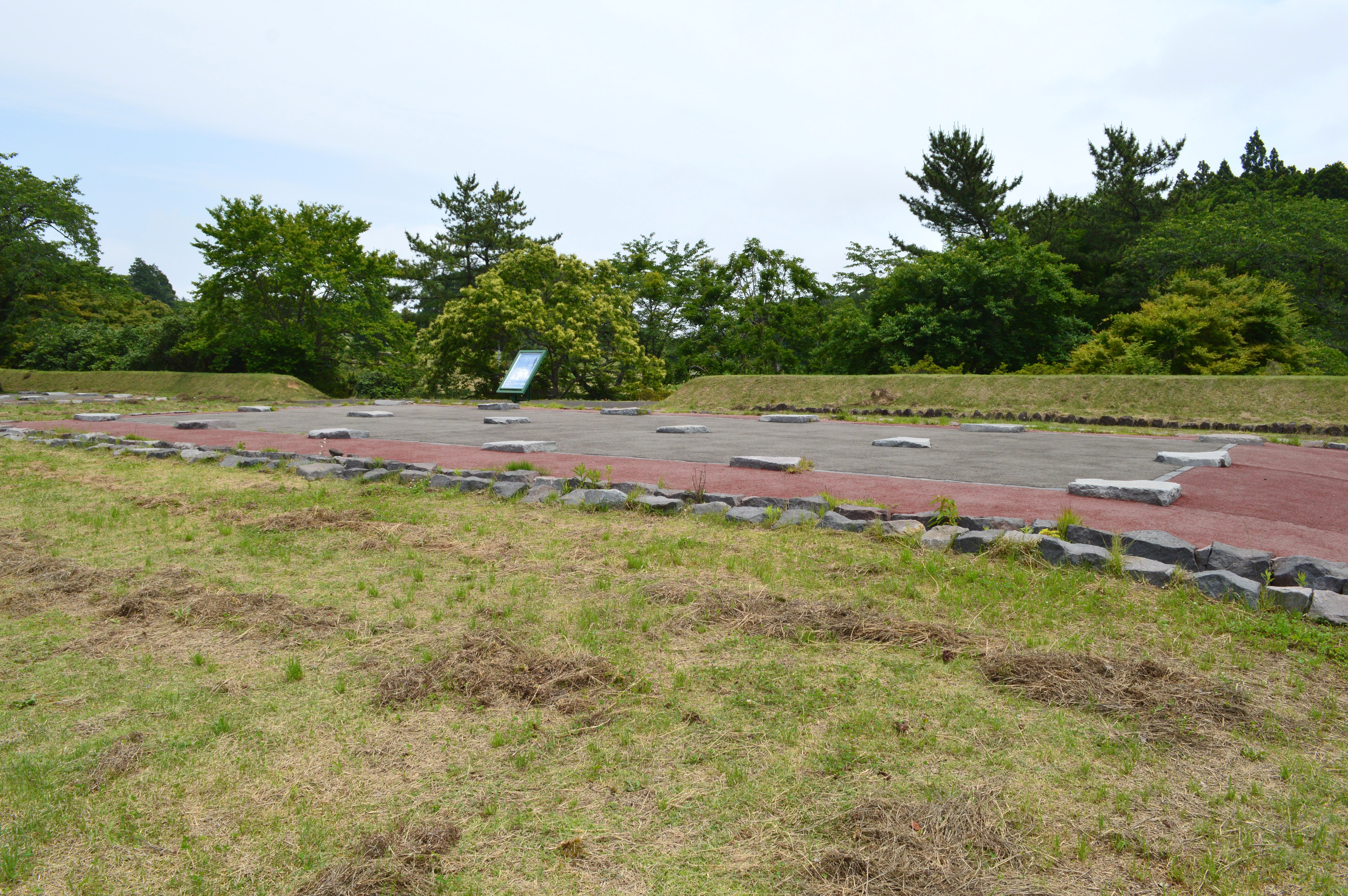
Site of the Eastern Palace

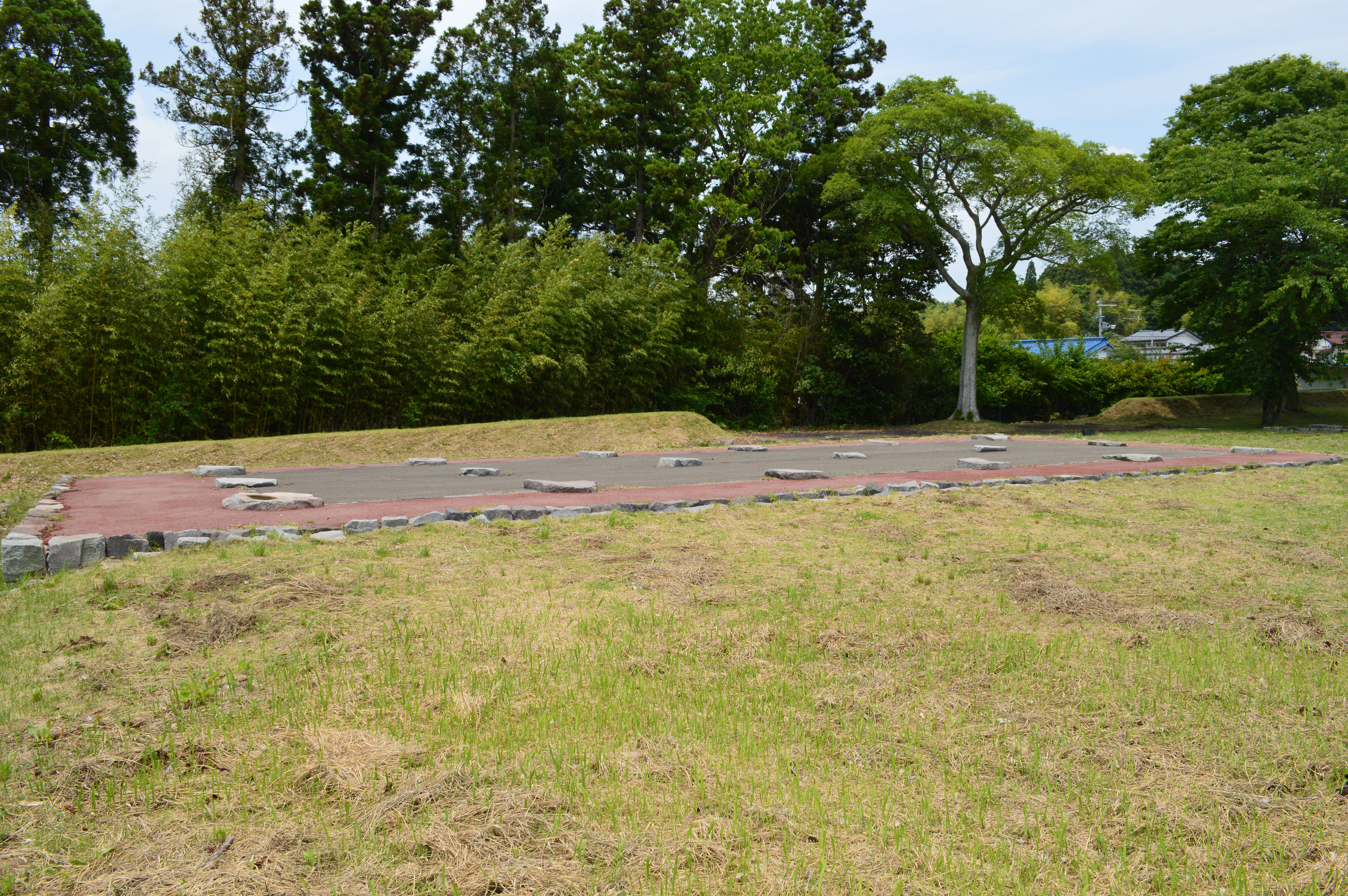
Site of the Western Palace

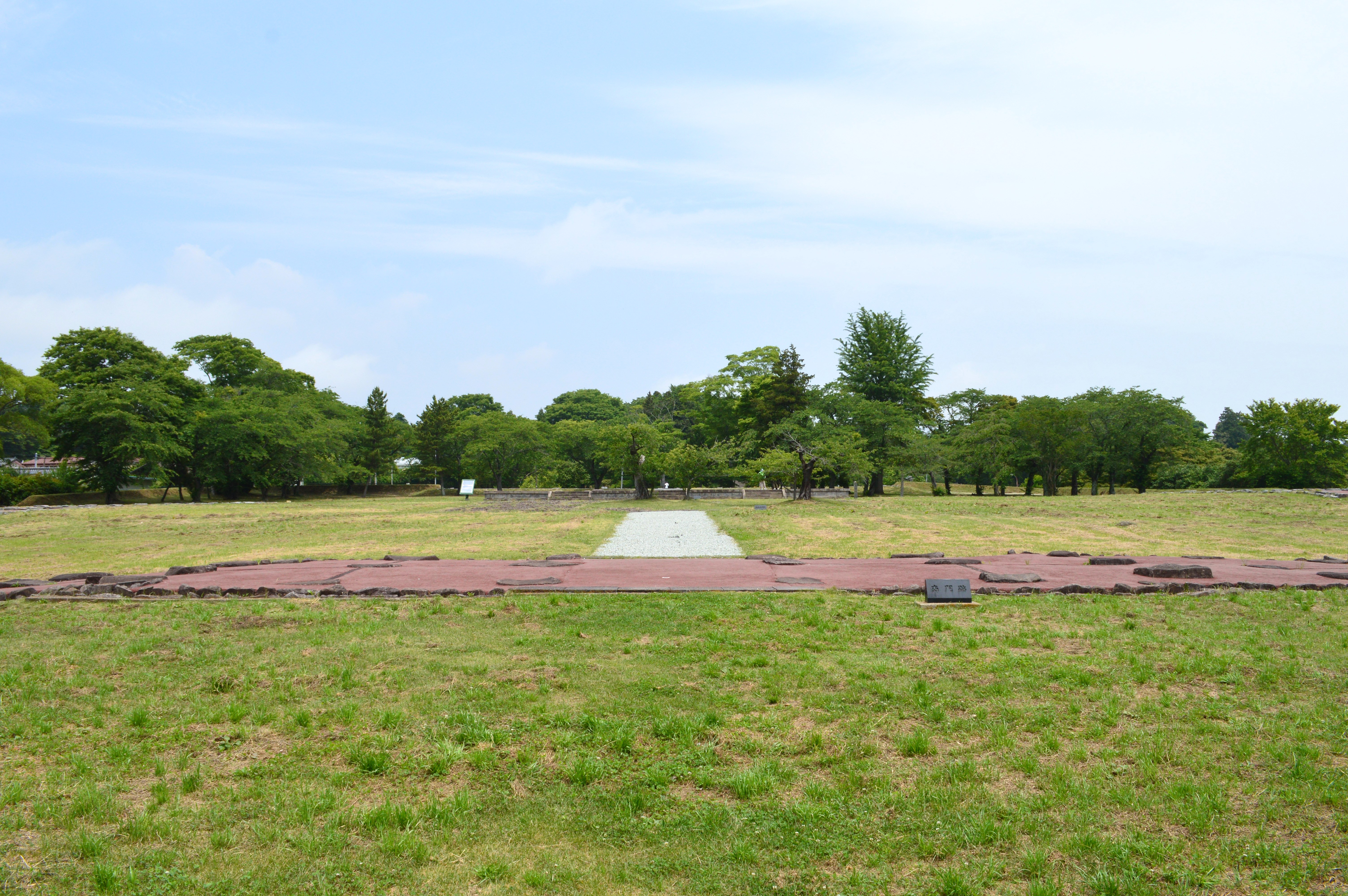
Site of the South Gate

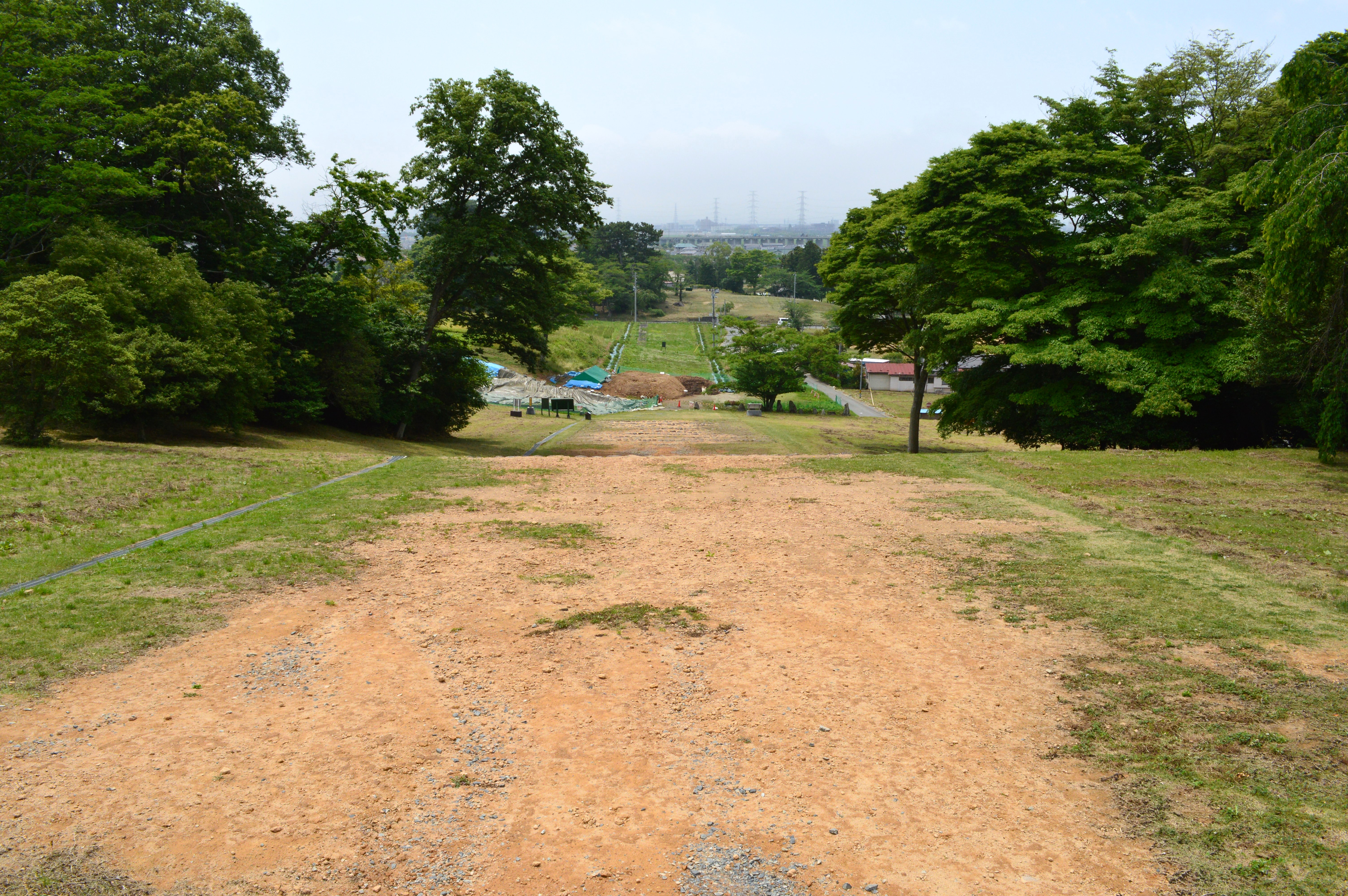
from the center facing south

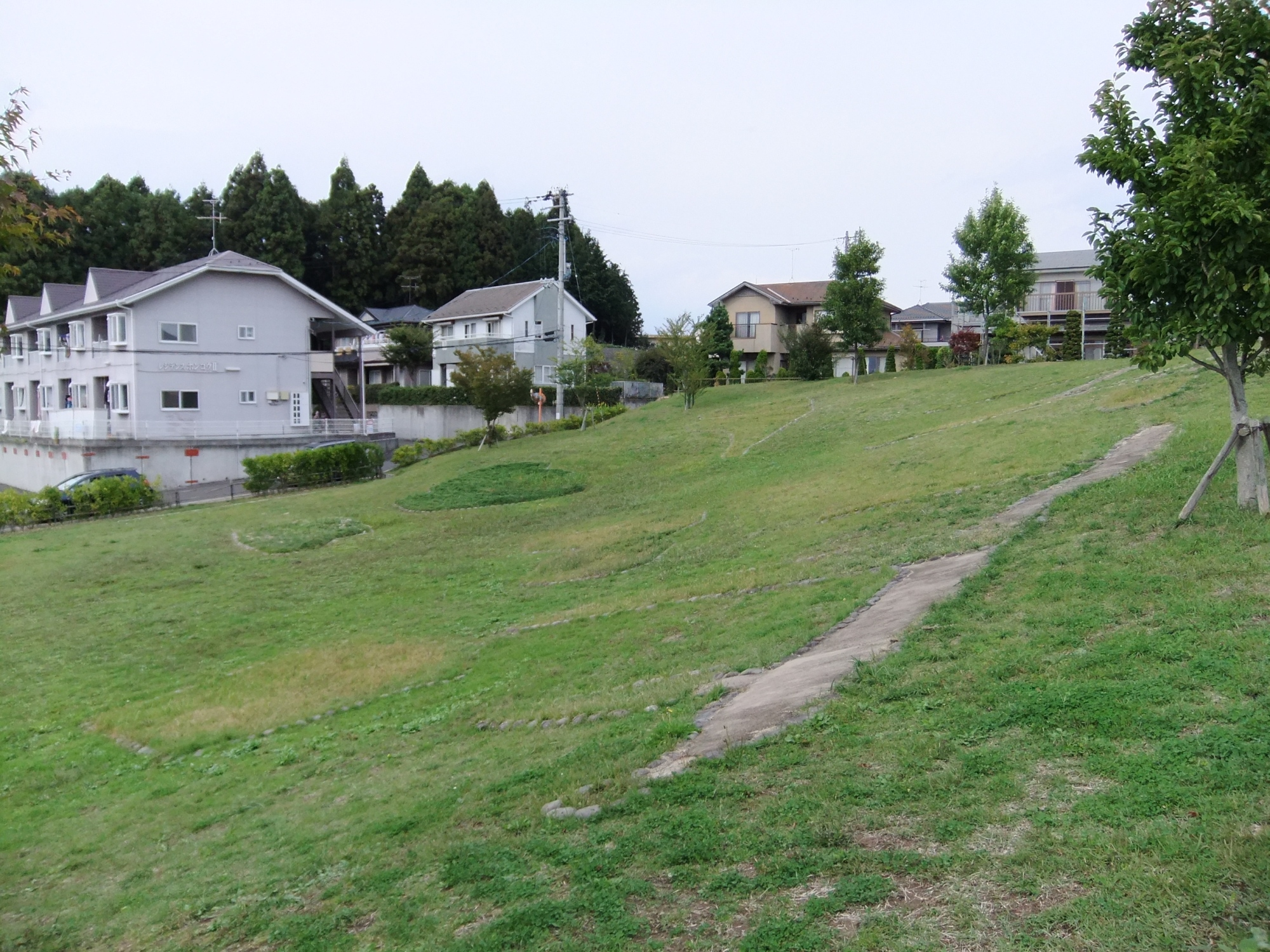
ruins of a foundry

== Tagajō Stele ==
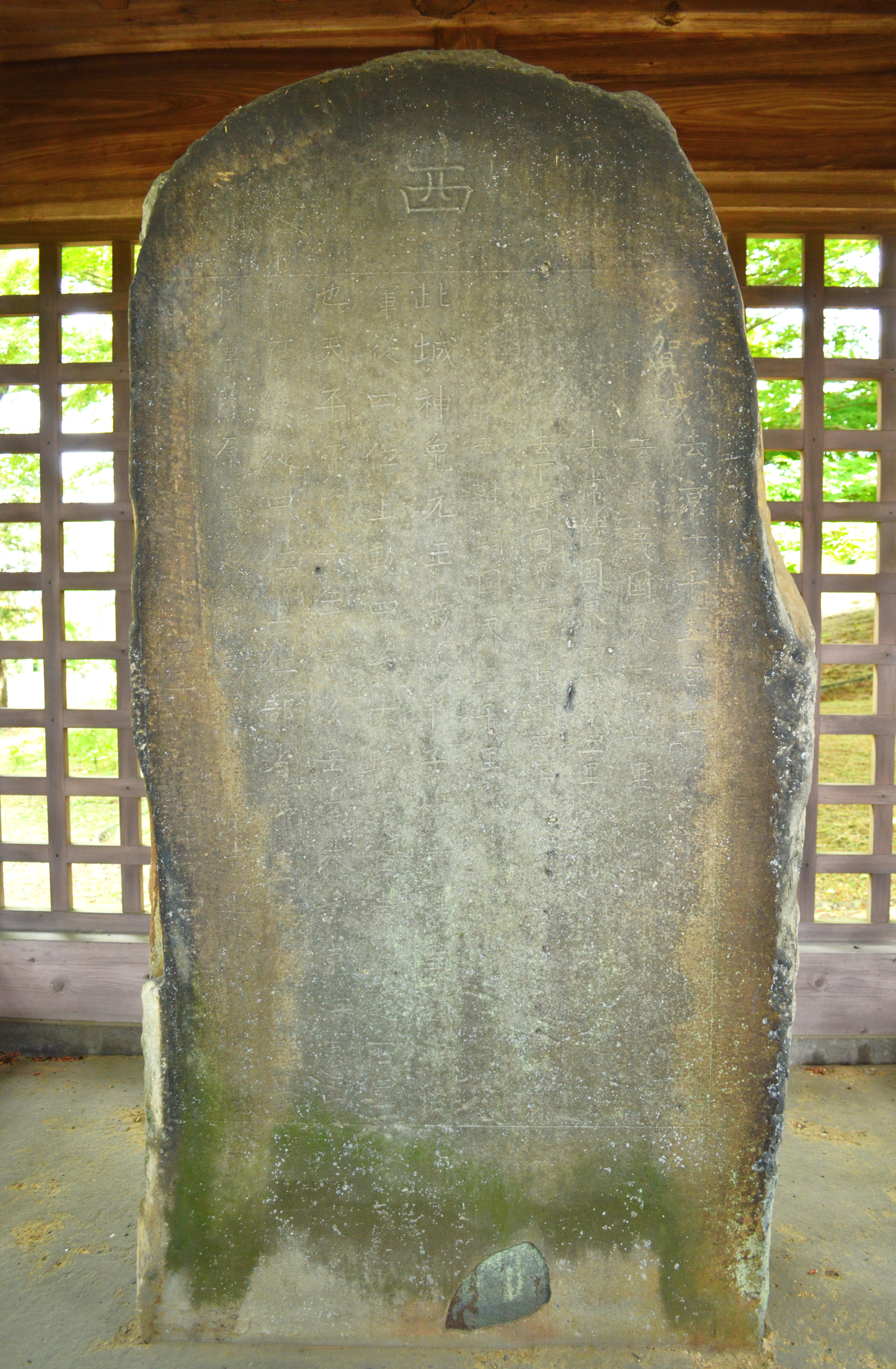
Tagajōhi

The Tsubo no Ishibumi (壺の碑) or Tagajōhi (多賀城碑) is a stone stele with a Nara period inscription that gives distances to the capital at Heian-kyō, the province of the Emishi, and other regions. It is located on a small hill close to the south gate of the outer castle ruins. Made of granite sandstone, it stands vertically facing almost due west, with a semicircular top and one almost flat surface on which kanji characters are carved. The character "west" is carved in large letters at the top of the monument, and within the rectangular enclosure below that, 140 characters are carved in 11 lines, and states that Taga Castle was founded in 724 by Ono Azumahito, the inspector and guardian general, and its repaired in 762 by chinjufu shogun Fujiwara no Nakamaro. The monument was discovered in the Kanbun or Enpō eras of the Edo period (1661–1671) and was viewed in 1689 by Matsuo Bashō (松尾 芭蕉), who creatively recounts his viewing of the monument in Oku no Hosomichi (奥の細道), concluding 'there are seldom any certain vestiges of what has been, yet in this place there are wholly trustworthy memorials of events a millennium ago' and is moved to tears. In his account the monument functions as a poetic place or utamakura. The monument also drew the attention of Tokugawa Mitsukuni. Although doubts were raised as to the monument's authenticity almost since the time of its discovery, archaeological excavations conducted since 1969 date of construction Taga Castle, it scale, structure, etc. do not contradict the contents of the inscription. Furthermore, the style of the calligraphy matches the Shōsō-in documents and mokkan (wooden tablets) of the period. Furthermore, the foundation underneath the monument was the same style as the foundations for structures at Taga Castle.

In 1998 it was designated an Important Cultural Property, and this designation was elevated to that of a National Treasure in 2024.

== Tagajō Temple ruins ==
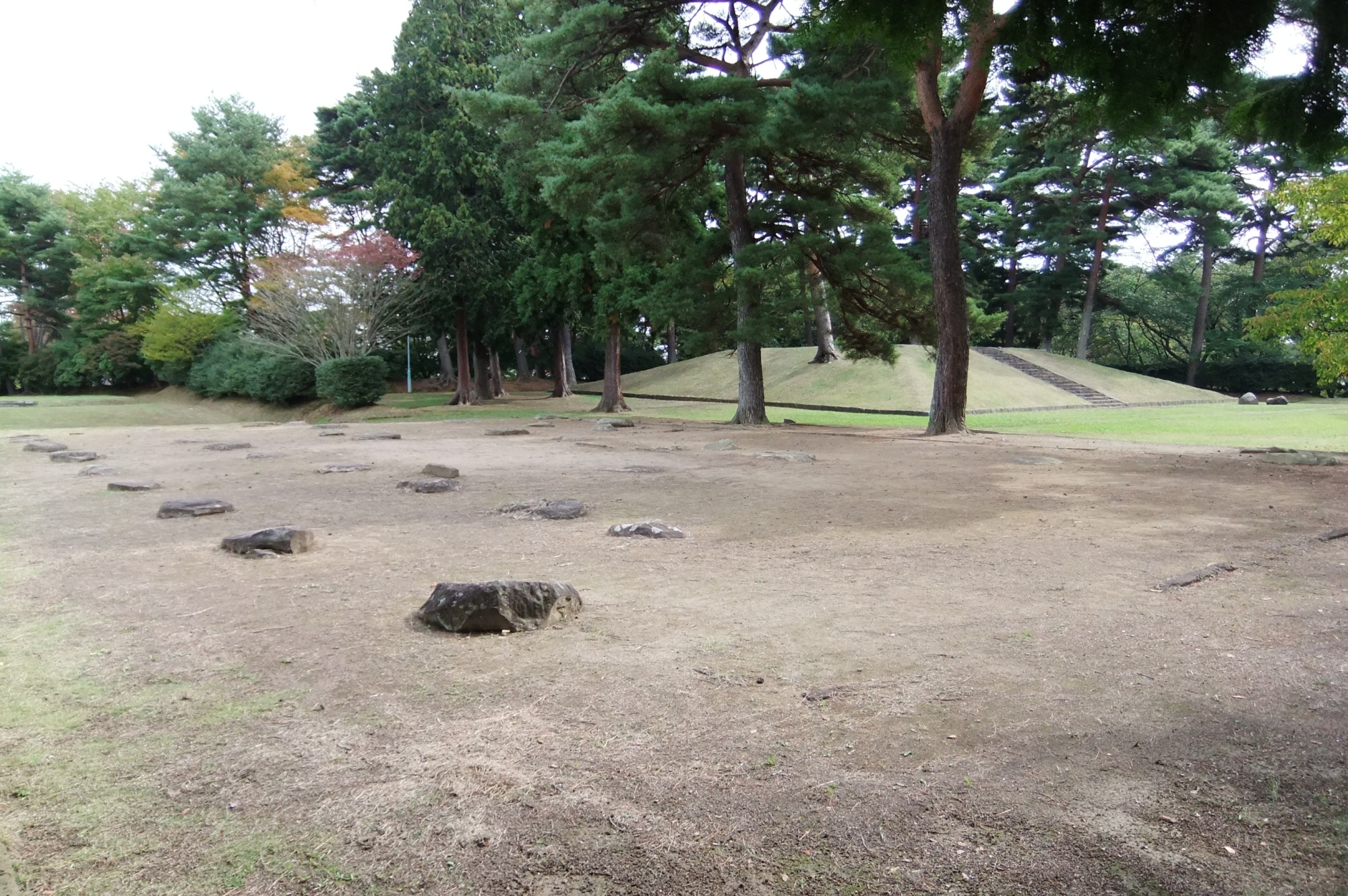
Tagajō Temple ruins

Excavations to the southeast of the fort have uncovered the ruins of a temple, now known as Tagajō Haiji. Such temples were built in concert with a provincial administrative center. Five buildings have been identified inside a large rectangular compound enclosed by an earthen wall.

== Tōhoku History Museum ==
The Tōhoku History Museum (東北歴史博物館), on the grounds of the Taga Castle, has finds from the excavations as well as from other sites in Tōhoku.

== See also ==
- Emishi
- List of Historic Sites of Japan (Miyagi)
- Dazaifu
- List of Special Places of Scenic Beauty, Special Historic Sites and Special Natural Monuments
