= Nigatake Station =

Railway station in Sendai, Japan

Nigatake Station 苦竹駅
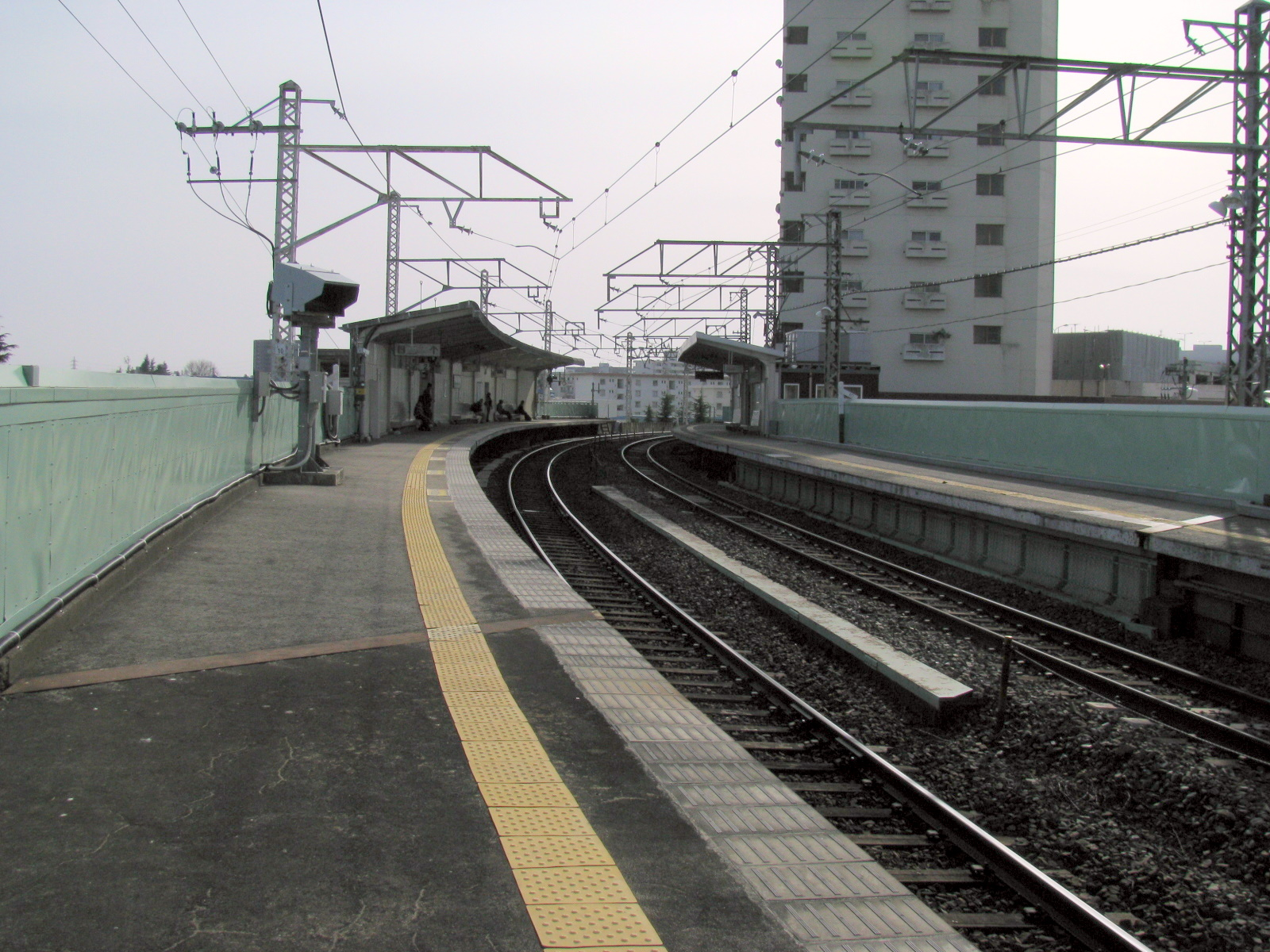
- Nigatake Station, March 2008

General information
- Location: 1-7-33 Nigatake, Miyagino-ku, Sendai-shi, Miyagi-ken 983-0036; Japan
- Coordinates: 38.2685°N 140.9187°E
- Operator: JR East
- Line: ■ Senseki Line
- Distance: 4.0 km from Aoba-dōri
- Platforms: 2 side platforms
- Tracks: 2

Other information
- Status: Staffed
- Website: Official website

History
- Opened: May 15, 1928
- Rebuilt: 2003
- Former names: Shinden Station (to 1943)

Passengers
- FY2018: 2969 daily

Services
Preceding station	JR East	Following station
Rikuzen-Haranomachi towards Aoba-dori	Senseki Line	Kozurushinden towards Ishinomaki
Location
- Location within Miyagi Prefecture Location within Japan

Nigatake Station (苦竹駅, Nigatake-eki) is a railway station in Miyagino-ku in Sendai, Miyagi, Japan operated by East Japan Railway Company (JR East).

== Lines ==
Nigatake Station is served by the Senseki Line. It is located 4.0 rail kilometers from the terminus of the Senseki Line at Aoba-dōri.

== Station layout ==
The station has two elevated opposed side platforms with the station building located underneath the platforms.

=== Platforms ===
1	■ Senseki Line	for Tagajō, Matsushima-Kaigan, Takagimachi
2	■ Senseki Line	for Sendai and Aoba-dōri

== History ==
Nigatake Station opened on May 15, 1928 as Shinden Station (神殿駅) on the Miyagi Electric Railway. The station renamed to its present name on February 8, 1943. The line was nationalized on May 1, 1944. The station was absorbed into the JR East network upon the privatization of JNR on April 1, 1987.

== Passenger statistics ==
In fiscal 2018, the station was used by an average of 2,969 passengers daily (boarding passengers only).

== Surrounding area ==
- Sendai Nigatake Police Office

== See also ==
- List of railway stations in Japan
