= Rikuzen-Haranomachi Station =

Railway station in Sendai, Japan

Rikuzen-Haranomachi Station 陸前原ノ町駅
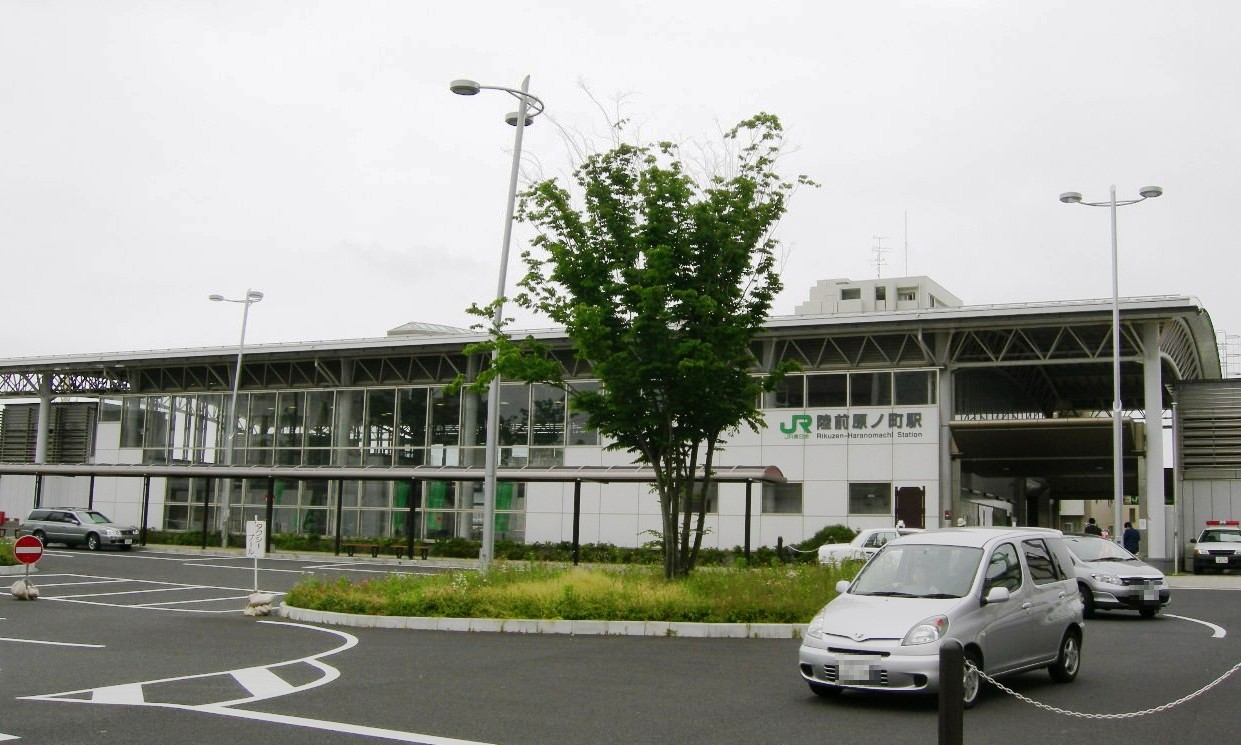
- Rikuzen-Haranomachi Station, June 2010

General information
- Location: 2-12-36 Gorin, Miyagino-ku, Sendai-shi Miyagi-ken 983-0842; Japan
- Coordinates: 38°15′58″N 140°54′40″E
- Operator: JR East
- Line: ■ Senseki Line
- Distance: 3.3 km from Aoba-dōri
- Platforms: 2 side platforms
- Tracks: 2

Other information
- Status: Staffed (Midori no Madoguchi)
- Website: Official website

History
- Opened: 5 June 1925
- Rebuilt: 2000

Passengers
- FY2018: 4281 daily

Services
Preceding station	JR East	Following station
Miyaginohara towards Aoba-dori	Senseki Line	Nigatake towards Ishinomaki
Location
- Location within Japan

Rikuzen-Haranomachi Station (陸前原ノ町駅, Rikuzen-Haranomachi-eki) is an underground railway station in Miyagino-ku in Sendai, Miyagi, Japan operated by East Japan Railway Company (JR East).

== Lines ==
Rikuzen-Haranomachi Station is served by the Senseki Line. It is located 3.3 rail kilometers from the terminus of the Senseki Line at Aoba-dōri.

== Station layout ==
The station is an underground station with two opposed side platforms. The station has a Midori no Madoguchi staffed ticket office.

=== Platforms ===
1	■ Senseki Line	for Tagajō, Matsushima-Kaigan, Takagimachi
2	■ Senseki Line	for Sendai and Aoba-dōri

== History ==
Rikuzen-Haranomachi opened on June 5, 1925 as a station on the Miyagi Electric Railway. The line was nationalized on May 1, 1944. The station was absorbed into the JR East network upon the privatization of JNR on April 1, 1987. The station was relocated underground in March 2000.

== Passenger statistics ==
In fiscal 2018, the station was used by an average of 4,281 passengers daily (boarding passengers only).

== Surrounding area ==
- National Route 45
- Miyagino Ward Office
- East Sendai Police Office

== See also ==
- List of railway stations in Japan
