= Rikuzen-Takasago Station =

Railway station in Sendai, Japan

Rikuzen-Takasago Station 陸前高砂駅
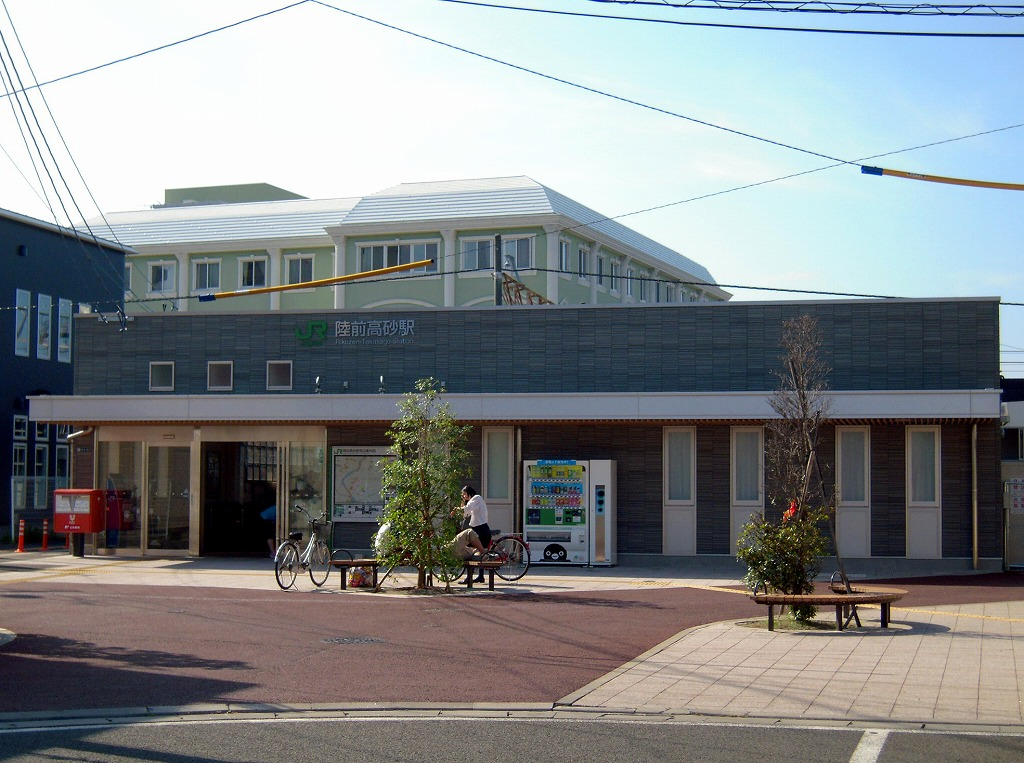
- Rikuzen-Takasago Station, July 2011

General information
- Location: Maeda, Fukumuro, Miyagino-ku, Sendai-shi, Miyagi-ken 983-0005; Japan
- Coordinates: 38.2735°N 140.9675°E operator = JR East
- Line: ■ Senseki Line
- Distance: 8.6 km from Aoba-dōri
- Platforms: 2 side platforms
- Tracks: 2

Other information
- Status: Staffed (Midori no Madoguchi)
- Website: Official website

History
- Opened: June 5, 1925
- Rebuilt: 2011

Passengers
- FY2018: 5438 daily

Services
Preceding station	JR East	Following station
Fukudamachi towards Aoba-dori	Senseki Line	Nakanosakae towards Ishinomaki
Location
- Location within Miyagi Prefecture Location within Japan

Rikuzen-Takasago Station (陸前高砂駅, Rikuzen-Takasago-eki) is a railway station in Miyagino-ku, Sendai, Miyagi Prefecture, Japan, operated by East Japan Railway Company (JR East).

== Lines ==
Rikuzen-Takasago Station is served by the Senseki Line. It is located 8.6 rail kilometers from the terminus of the Senseki Line at Aoba-dōri.

== Station layout ==
The station has two opposed side platforms connected to the station building by a footbridge. The station has a "Midori no Madoguchi" staffed ticket office.

=== Platforms ===
1	■ Senseki Line	for Sendai and Aoba-dōri
2	■ Senseki Line	for Tagajō, Matsushima-Kaigan, and Takagimachi

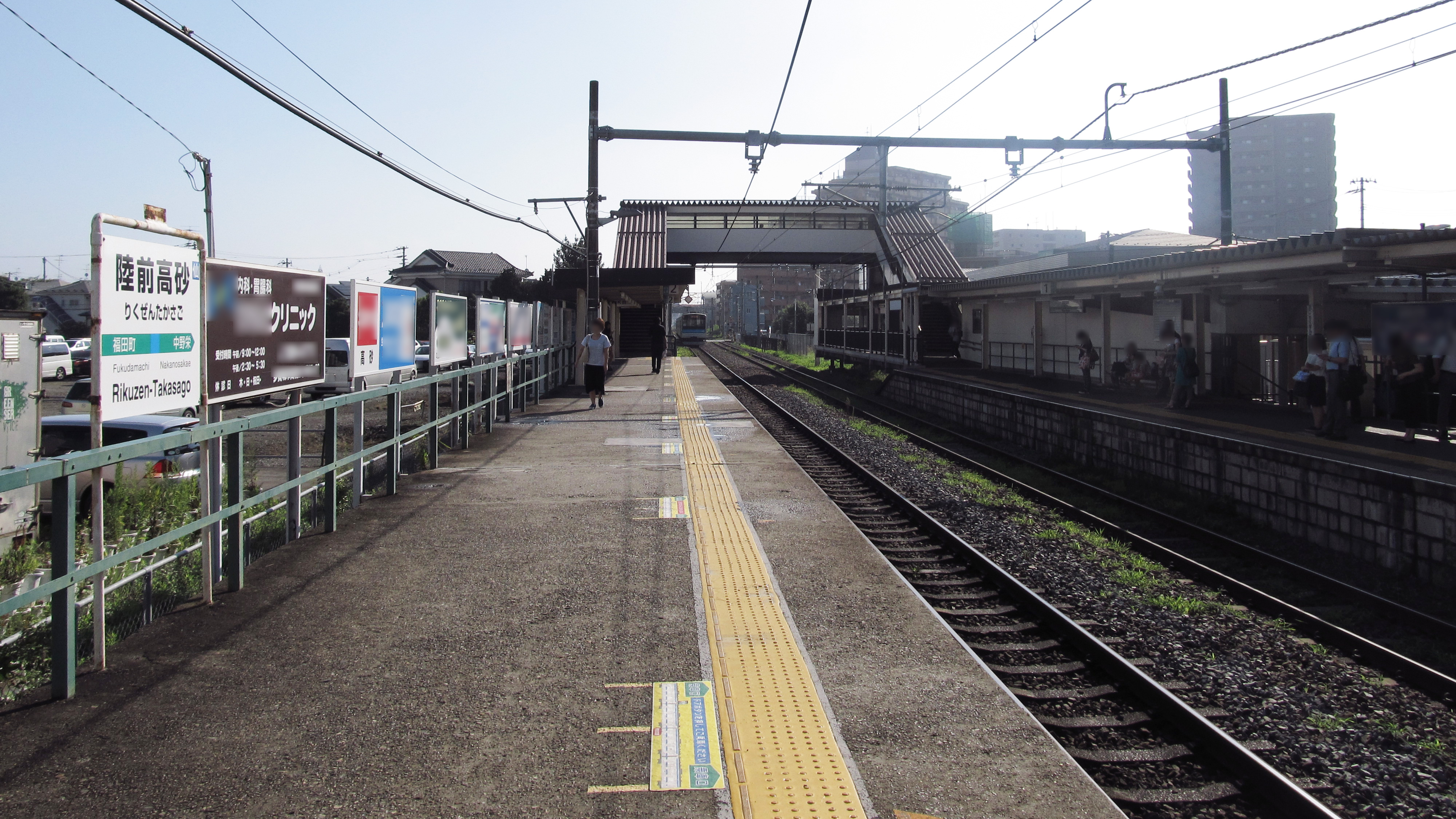
The platforms in August 2014

== History ==
Rikuzen-Takasago Station opened on June 5, 1925 as a station on the Miyagi Electric Railway. The line was nationalized on May 1, 1944. The station was absorbed into the JR East network upon the privatization of JNR on April 1, 1987. A new station building was completed in June 2011.

== Passenger statistics ==
In fiscal 2018, the station was used by an average of 5,438 passengers daily (boarding passengers only).

== Surrounding area ==
- Fukumuro district (residential)
- Fukumuro Elementary School
- National Route 45

== See also ==
- List of railway stations in Japan
