= Kozurushinden Station =

Railway station in Sendai, Japan

Kozurushinden Station 小鶴新田駅
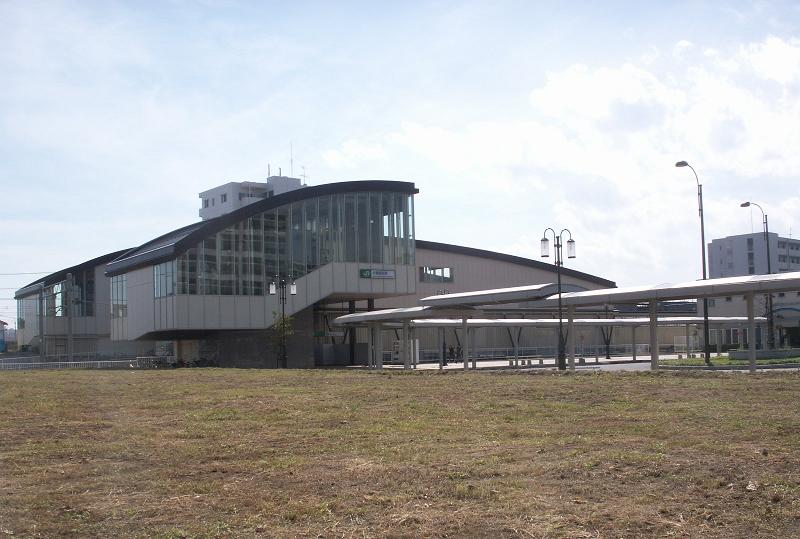
- Kozurushinden Station, September 2007

General information
- Location: 3-20 Higashi Shinden, Miyagino-ku, Sendai-shi, Miyagi-ken 983-0039; Japan
- Coordinates: 38.2736°N 140.9352°E
- Operator: JR East
- Line: ■ Senseki Line
- Distance: 5.6 km from Aoba-dōri
- Platforms: 2 side platforms
- Tracks: 2

Other information
- Status: Staffed (Midori no Madoguchi)
- Website: Official website

History
- Opened: March 13, 2004

Passengers
- FY2018: 6286 daily

Services
Preceding station	JR East	Following station
Nigatake towards Aoba-dori	Senseki Line	Fukudamachi towards Ishinomaki
Location
- Location within Miyagi Prefecture Location within Japan

Kozurushinden Station (小鶴新田駅, Kozurushinden-eki) is a railway station in Miyagino-ku in Sendai, Miyagi, Japan operated by East Japan Railway Company (JR East).

== Lines ==
Kozurushinden Station is served by the Senseki Line. It is located 5.6 rail kilometers from the terminus of the Senseki Line at Aoba-dōri.

== Station layout ==
The station has two opposed side platforms with the station building located above the platforms. The station has a Midori no Madoguchi staffed ticket office.

=== Platforms ===
1	■ Senseki Line	for Tagajō, Matsushima-Kaigan, Takagimachi
2	■ Senseki Line	for Sendai and Aoba-dōri

== History ==
Kozurushinden Station opened on March 13, 2004.

== Passenger statistics ==
In fiscal 2018, the station was used by an average of 6,286 passengers daily (boarding passengers only).

== Surrounding area ==
The area surrounding the station is mainly residential with many newly (~2008) constructed apartment buildings. There is a Coca-Cola factory located nearby.

== See also ==
- List of railway stations in Japan
