= Fukudamachi Station =

Railway station in Sendai, Japan

Fukudamachi Station 福田町駅
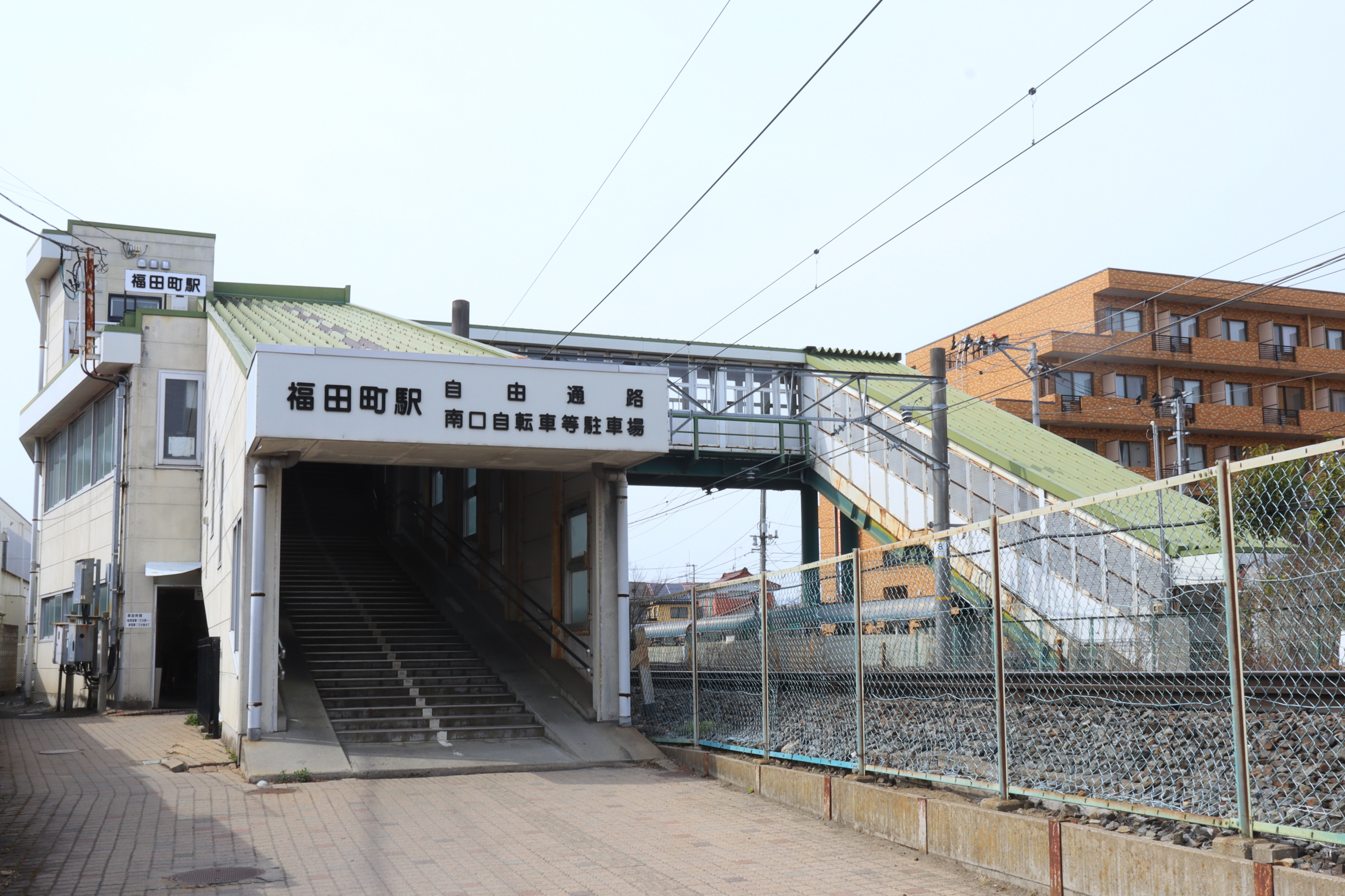
- Fukudamachi Station, March 2025

General information
- Location: 1-12-1 Fukudamachi, Miyagino-ku, Sendai-shi, Miyagi-ken 983-0023; Japan
- Coordinates: 38.2749°N 140.9583°E
- Operator: JR East
- Line: ■ Senseki Line
- Distance: 7.7 km from Aoba-dōri
- Platforms: 1 island platform
- Tracks: 2

Other information
- Status: Staffed
- Website: Official website

History
- Opened: June 5, 1925

Passengers
- FY2016: 3971 daily

Services
Preceding station	JR East	Following station
Kozurushinden towards Aoba-dori	Senseki Line	Rikuzen-Takasago towards Ishinomaki
Location
- Location within Miyagi Prefecture Location within Japan

Fukudamachi Station (福田町駅, Fukudamachi-eki) is a railway station in Miyagino-ku in Sendai, Miyagi, Japan operated by East Japan Railway Company (JR East).

== Lines ==
Fukudamachi Station is served by the Senseki Line. It is located 7.7 rail kilometers from the terminus of the Senseki Line at Aoba-dōri.

== Station layout ==
The station has one island platform connected to the station building by a footbridge. The station is staffed.

=== Platforms ===
1	■ Senseki Line	for Tagajō, Matsushima-Kaigan, Takagimachi
2	■ Senseki Line	for Sendai and Aoba-dōri

== History ==
Fukudamachi Station opened on June 5, 1925 as a station on the Miyagi Electric Railway. The line was nationalized on May 1, 1944. The station was absorbed into the JR East network upon the privatization of JNR on April 1, 1987.

== Passenger statistics ==
In fiscal 2018, the station was used by an average of 3,971 passengers daily (boarding passengers only).

== Surrounding area ==
- National Route 45
- Sendai Fukudamachi Post Office

== See also ==
- List of railway stations in Japan
