= Nakanosakae Station =

Railway station in Sendai, Japan

Nakanosakae Station 中野栄駅
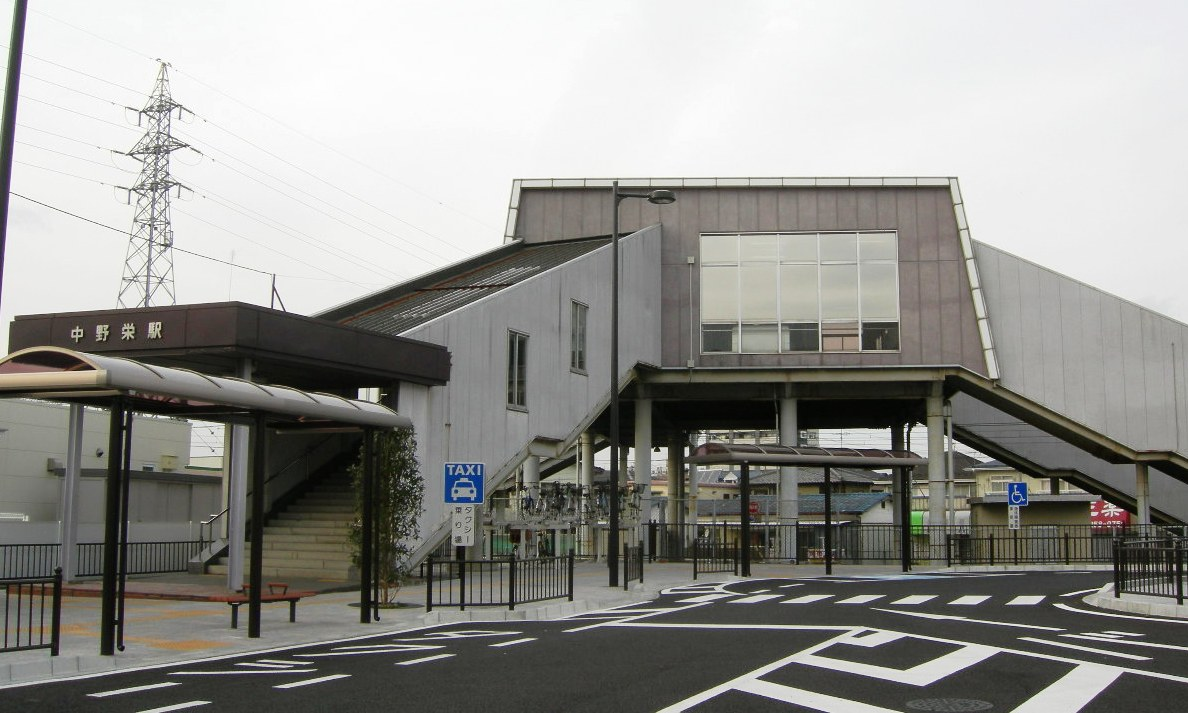
- Nakanosakae Station, June 2010

General information
- Location: 4-10-15 Sakae, Miyagino-ku, Sendai-shi, Miyagi-ken 983-0013; Japan
- Coordinates: 38.28077°N 140.98532°E
- Operator: JR East
- Line: ■ Senseki Line
- Distance: 10.3 km from Aoba-dōri
- Platforms: 2 side platforms
- Tracks: 2

Other information
- Status: Staffed (Midori no Madoguchi)
- Website: Official website

History
- Opened: April 1, 1981

Passengers
- FY2018: 5580 daily

Services
Preceding station	JR East	Following station
Rikuzen-Takasago towards Aoba-dori	Senseki Line	Tagajō towards Ishinomaki
Location
- Location within Sendai Location within Miyagi Prefecture Location within Japan

Nakanosakae Station (中野栄駅, Nakanosakae-eki) is a railway station in Miyagino-ku in Sendai, Miyagi, Japan operated by East Japan Railway Company (JR East).

== Lines ==
Nakanosakae Station is served by the Senseki Line. It is located 10.3 rail kilometers from the terminus of the Senseki Line at Aoba-dōri.

== Station layout ==
The station has two opposed side platforms connected to the station building by a footbridge. The station has a Midori no Madoguchi staffed ticket office.

=== Platforms ===
1	■ Senseki Line	for Tagajō, Matsushima-Kaigan, Takagimachi
2	■ Senseki Line	for Sendai and Aoba-dōri

== History ==
Nakanosakae Station opened on April 1, 1981. The station was absorbed into the JR East network upon the privatization of JNR on April 1, 1987.

== Passenger statistics ==
In fiscal 2018, the station was used by an average of 5,580 passengers daily (boarding passengers only).

== Surrounding area ==
- National Route 45
- Sendai Ikuei Gakuen High School Tagajo Campus
- Sendai Sakae Post Office

== See also ==
- List of railway stations in Japan
