= Nishi-Shiogama Station =

Railway station in Shiogama, Miyagi Prefecture, Japan

Nishi-Shiogama Station 西塩釜駅
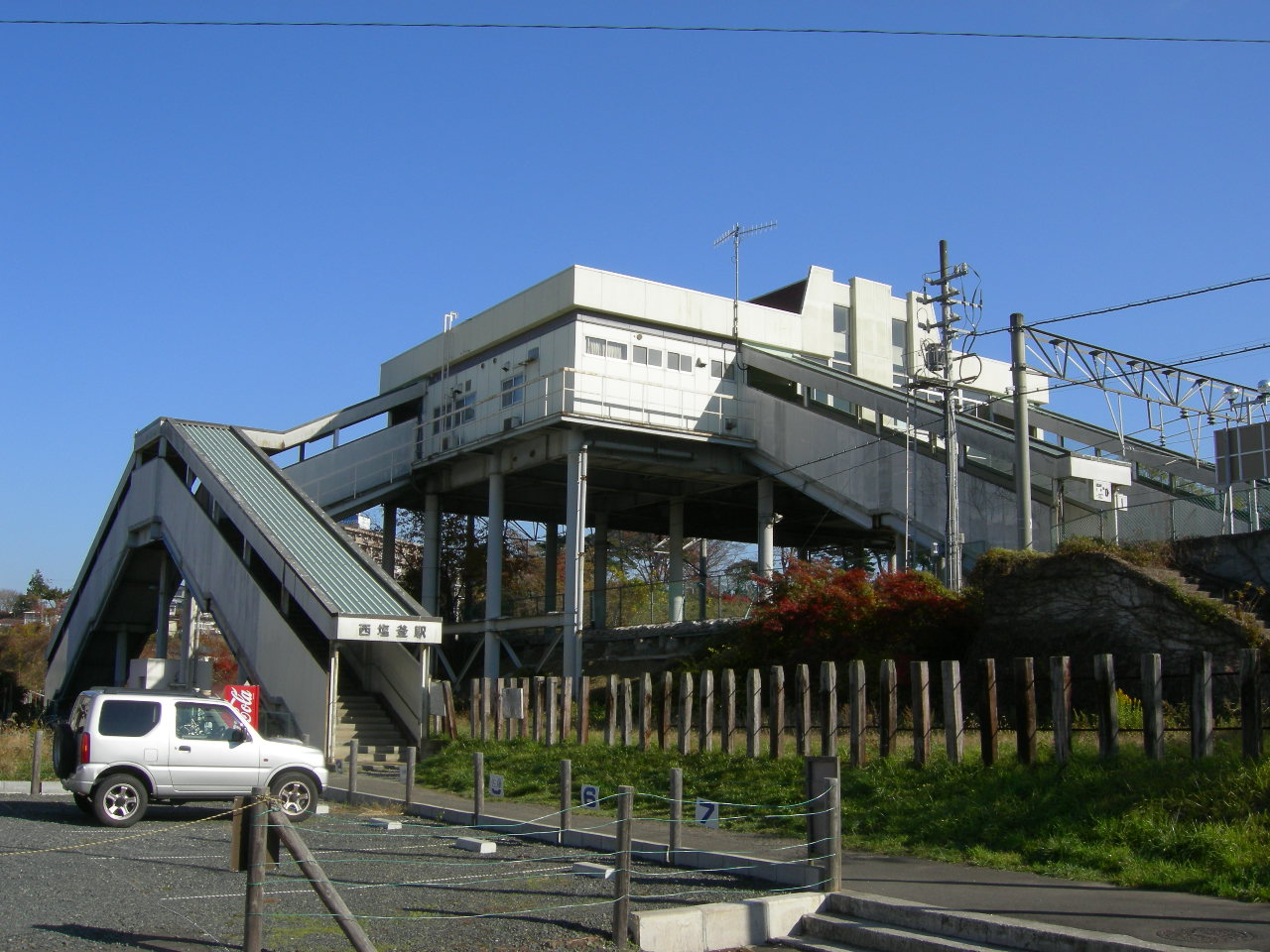
- Nishi-Shiogama Station, November 2006

General information
- Location: 1-11 Nishiki-cho, Shiogama-shi, Miyagi-ken 985-0024; Japan
- Coordinates: 38.3119°N 141.0186°E
- Operator: JR East
- Line: ■ Senseki Line
- Distance: 15.2 km from Aoba-dōri
- Platforms: 2 side platforms
- Tracks: 2

Other information
- Status: Staffed
- Website: Official website

History
- Opened: June 5, 1925

Services
Preceding station	JR East	Following station
Geba towards Aoba-dori	Senseki Line	Hon-Shiogama towards Ishinomaki
Location
- Location within Japan

Nishi-Shiogama Station (西塩釜駅, Nishi-Shiogama-eki) is a railway station in the city of Shiogama, Miyagi Prefecture, Japan, operated by East Japan Railway Company (JR East).

== Lines ==
Nishi-Shiogama Station is served by the Senseki Line. It is located 15.2 rail kilometers from the terminus of the Senseki Line at Aoba-dōri Station.

== Station layout ==
Nishi-Shiogama Station has two opposed side platforms connected by a footbridge. The station is staffed.

=== Platforms ===
1	■ Senseki Line	for Matsushima-Kaigan and Takagimachi
2	■ Senseki Line	or Sendai and Aoba-dōri

== History ==
Nishi-Shiogama Station opened on June 5, 1925 as a station on the Miyagi Electric Railway. The line was nationalized on May 1, 1944. The station was absorbed into the JR East network upon the privatization of JNR on April 1, 1987.

== Surrounding area ==
- Shiogama Municipal Hospital
- Shiogama Temple
- Shiogama Station on the Tōhoku Main Line is within walking distance

== See also ==
- List of railway stations in Japan
