= Hon-Shiogama Station =

Railway station in Shiogama, Miyagi Prefecture, Japan

Hon-Shiogama Station 本塩釜駅
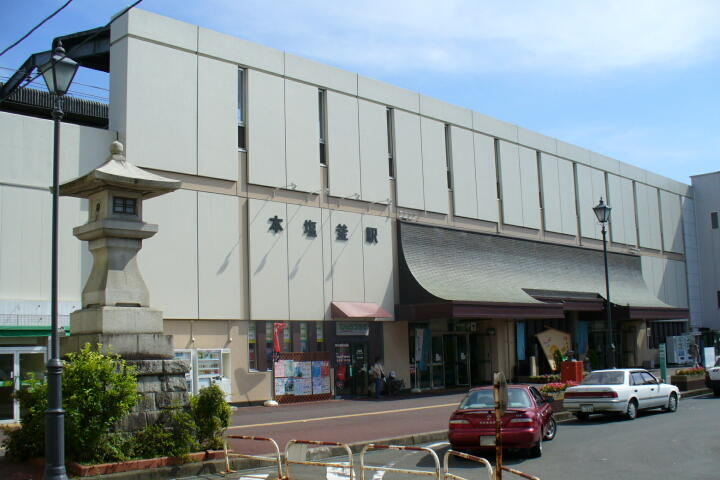
- Hon-Shiogama Station, August 2007

General information
- Location: Kaigan-dori, Shiogama, Miyagi-ken 985-0002; Japan
- Coordinates: 38.3176°N 141.0224°E
- Operator: JR East
- Line: ■ Senseki Line
- Distance: 16.0 km from Aoba-dōri
- Platforms: 2 side platforms
- Tracks: 2

Other information
- Status: Staffed ( Midori no Madoguchi)
- Website: Official website

History
- Opened: April 14, 1926

Passengers
- FY2016: 2,992 daily

Services
Preceding station	JR East	Following station
Nishi-Shiogama towards Aoba-dori	Senseki Line	Higashi-Shiogama towards Ishinomaki
Location
- Location within Japan

Hon-Shiogama Station (本塩釜駅, Hon-Shiogama-eki) is a railway station in the city of Shiogama, Miyagi Prefecture, Japan, operated by the East Japan Railway Company (JR East).

== Lines ==
Hon-Shiogama Station is served by the Senseki Line. It is located 16.0 rail kilometers from the terminus of the Senseki Line at Aoba-dōri Station.

== Station layout ==
Hon-Shiogama Station has two elevated opposed side platforms with the station building located underneath. The station has a Midori no Madoguchi staffed ticket office.

=== Platforms ===
1	■ Senseki Line	for Matsushima-Kaigan and Takagimachi
2	■ Senseki Line	or Sendai and Aoba-dōri

== History ==
Hon-Shiogama Station opened on April 14, 1926 as a station on the Miyagi Electric Railway. The line was nationalized on May 1, 1944. On November 1, 1981 the station was relocated to its present location and rebuilt as an elevated station. The station was absorbed into the JR East network upon the privatization of JNR on April 1, 1987.

== Passenger statistics ==
In fiscal 2016, the station was used by an average of 2,992 passengers daily (boarding passengers only).

== Surrounding area ==
- Shiogama City Hall
- Royal Home Center
- Highway 45
- Mae-Hon-Shiogama Post Office
- Shiogama Shrine
- Shiogama Port

== See also ==
- List of railway stations in Japan
