= Geba Station =

Railway station in Tagajō, Miyagi Prefecture, Japan

Geba Station 下馬駅
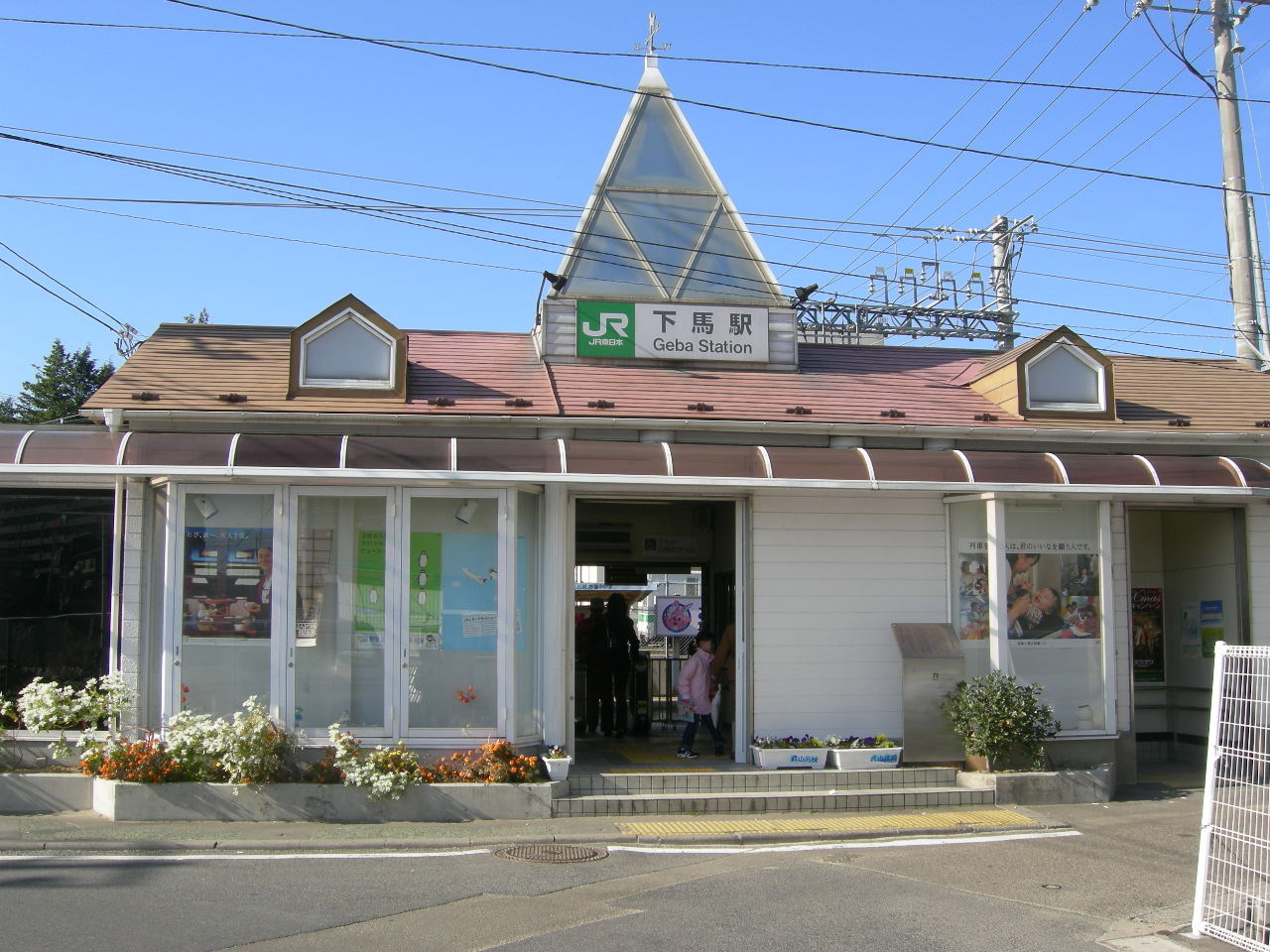
- Geba Station, November 2009

General information
- Location: 2-13-1 Geba, Tagajō-shi, Miyagi-ken 985-0835; Japan
- Coordinates: 38.3060°N 141.0151°E
- Operator: JR East
- Line: ■ Senseki Line
- Distance: 14.4 km from Aoba-dōri
- Platforms: 2 side platforms
- Tracks: 2

Other information
- Status: Staffed
- Website: Official website

History
- Opened: August 1, 1932

Passengers
- FY2018: 3,762 daily

Services
Preceding station	JR East	Following station
Tagajō towards Aoba-dori	Senseki Line	Nishi-Shiogama towards Ishinomaki
Location
- Location within Miyagi Prefecture Location within Japan

Geba Station (下馬駅, Geba-eki) is a railway station in the city of Tagajō, Miyagi Prefecture, Japan, operated by East Japan Railway Company (JR East).

== Lines ==
Geba Station is served by the Senseki Line. It is located 14.4 rail kilometers from the terminus of the Senseki Line at Aoba-dōri Station.

== Station layout ==
The station has two opposed side platforms connected by a footbridge. The station is staffed.

=== Platforms ===
1	■ Senseki Line	for Matsushima-Kaigan and Takagimachi
2	■ Senseki Line	for Sendai and Aoba-dōri

== History ==
Geba Station opened on August 1, 1932 as a station on the Miyagi Electric Railway. The line was nationalized on May 1, 1944. The station was absorbed into the JR East network upon the privatization of JNR on April 1, 1987. A new station building was completed in November 2013.

== Passenger statistics ==
In fiscal 2018, the station was used by an average of 3,762 passengers daily (boarding passengers only).

== Surrounding area ==
- Geba Post Office
- National Route 45

== See also ==
- List of railway stations in Japan
