= Higashi-Shiogama Station =

Railway station in Shiogama, Miyagi Prefecture, Japan

Higashi-Shiogama Station 東塩釜駅
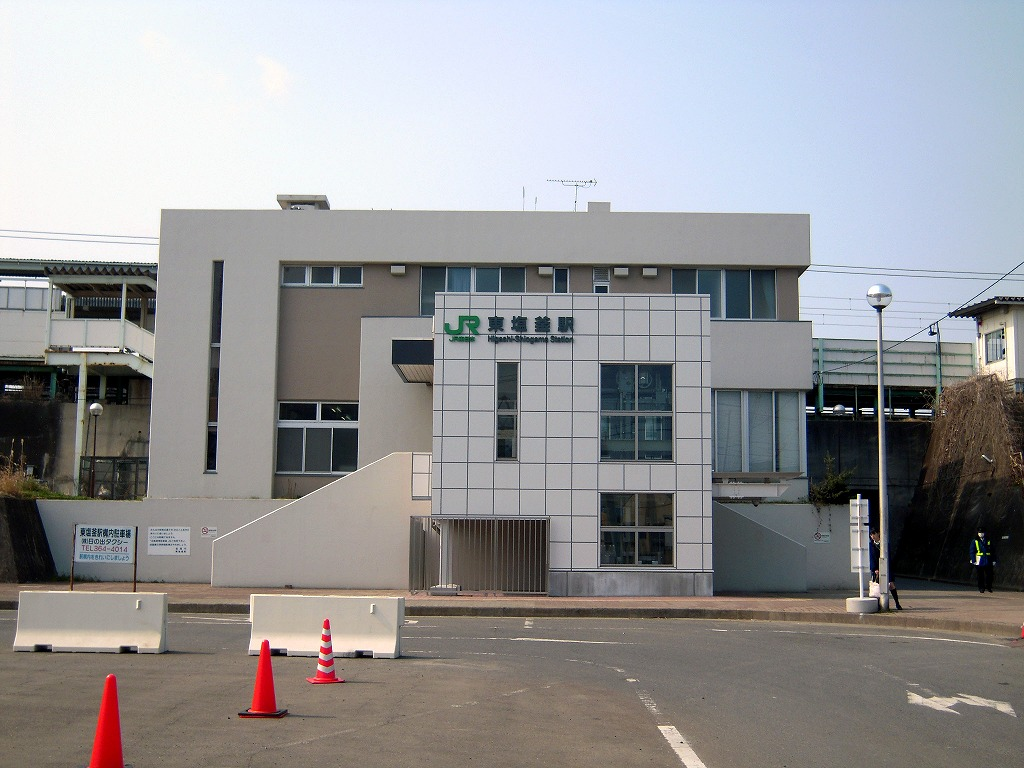
- Higashi-Shiogama Station in August 2011

General information
- Location: 3 Fujikura, Shiogama-shi, Miyagi-ken 985-0004; Japan
- Coordinates: 38.3255°N 141.0316°E
- Operator: JR East
- Line: ■ Senseki Line
- Distance: 17.2 km from Aoba-dōri
- Platforms: 1 side platform + 1 island platform
- Tracks: 3

Other information
- Status: Staffed
- Website: Official website

History
- Opened: 18 April 1927

Passengers
- FY2016: 2,485 daily

Services
Preceding station	JR East	Following station
Hon-Shiogama towards Aoba-dori	Senseki Line	Rikuzen-Hamada towards Ishinomaki
Location
- Location within Japan

Higashi-Shiogama Station (東塩釜駅, Higashi-Shiogama-eki) is a railway station on the Senseki Line in the city of Shiogama, Miyagi Prefecture, Japan, operated by East Japan Railway Company (JR East).

== Lines ==
Higashi-Shiogama Station is served by the Senseki Line, and is located 17.2 kilometers from the terminus of the Senseki Line at Aoba-dōri Station.

== Station layout ==
Higashi-Shiogama Station has one elevated side platform and one elevated island platform with the station building underneath.

=== Platforms ===
1	■ Senseki Line	for Sendai and Aoba-dōri
2	■ Senseki Line	for bi-directional traffic
3	■ Senseki Line	for Matsushima-Kaigan and Takagimachi

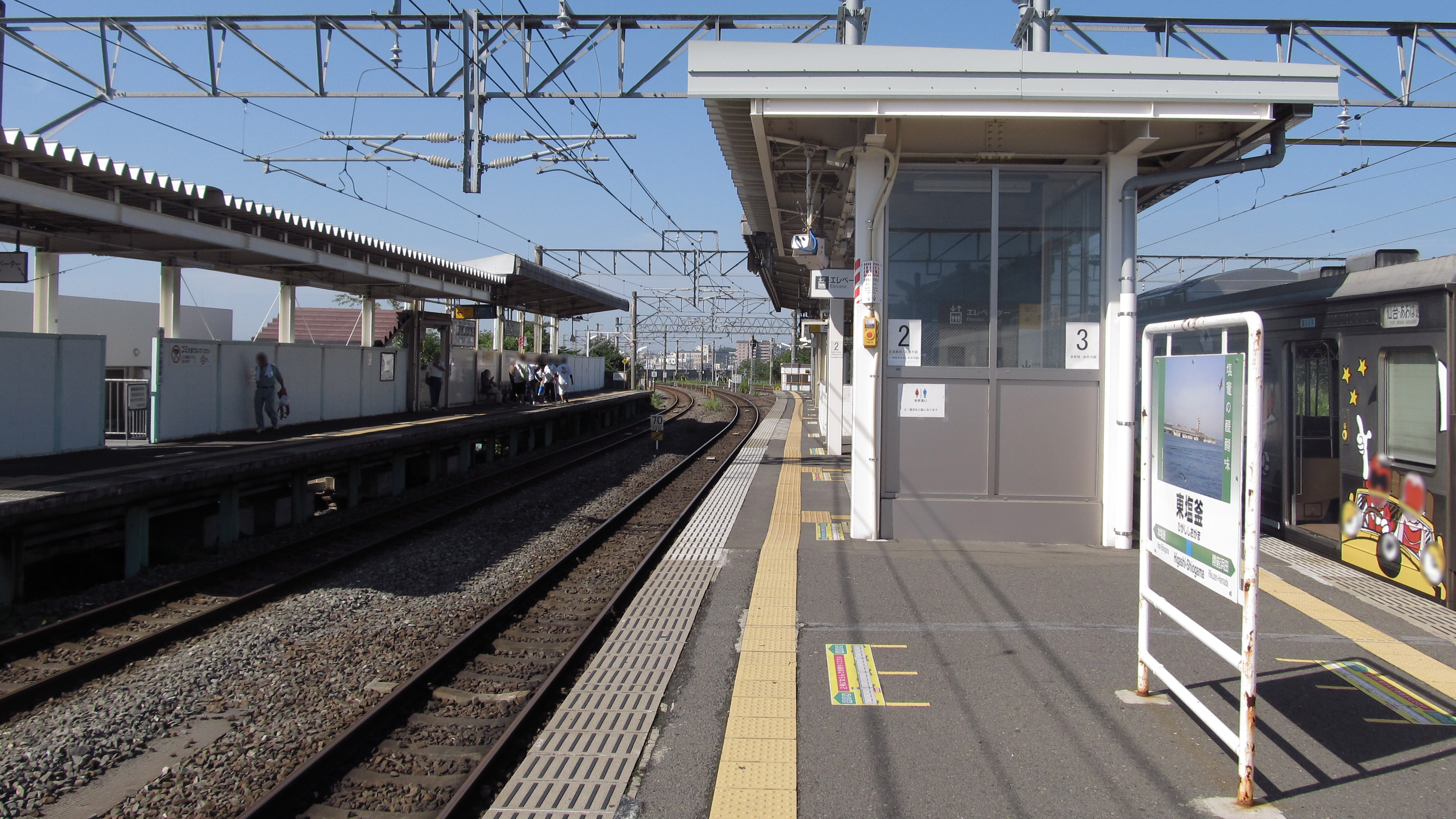
The platforms in August 2014

== History ==
Higashi-Shiogama Station opened on April 18, 1927 as a station on the Miyagi Electric Railway. The line was nationalized on May 1, 1944. On November 1, 1981 the station was relocated to its present location. The station was absorbed into the JR East network upon the privatization of Japanese National Railways (JNR) on April 1, 1987.

== Passenger statistics ==
In fiscal 2016, the station was used by an average of 2,458 passengers daily (boarding passengers only).

== Surrounding area ==
- Shiogama Port
- National Route 45
- Uminomachi Fine Arts Museum

== See also ==
- List of railway stations in Japan
