= Senseki Line =

Railway line in Miyagi prefecture, Japan

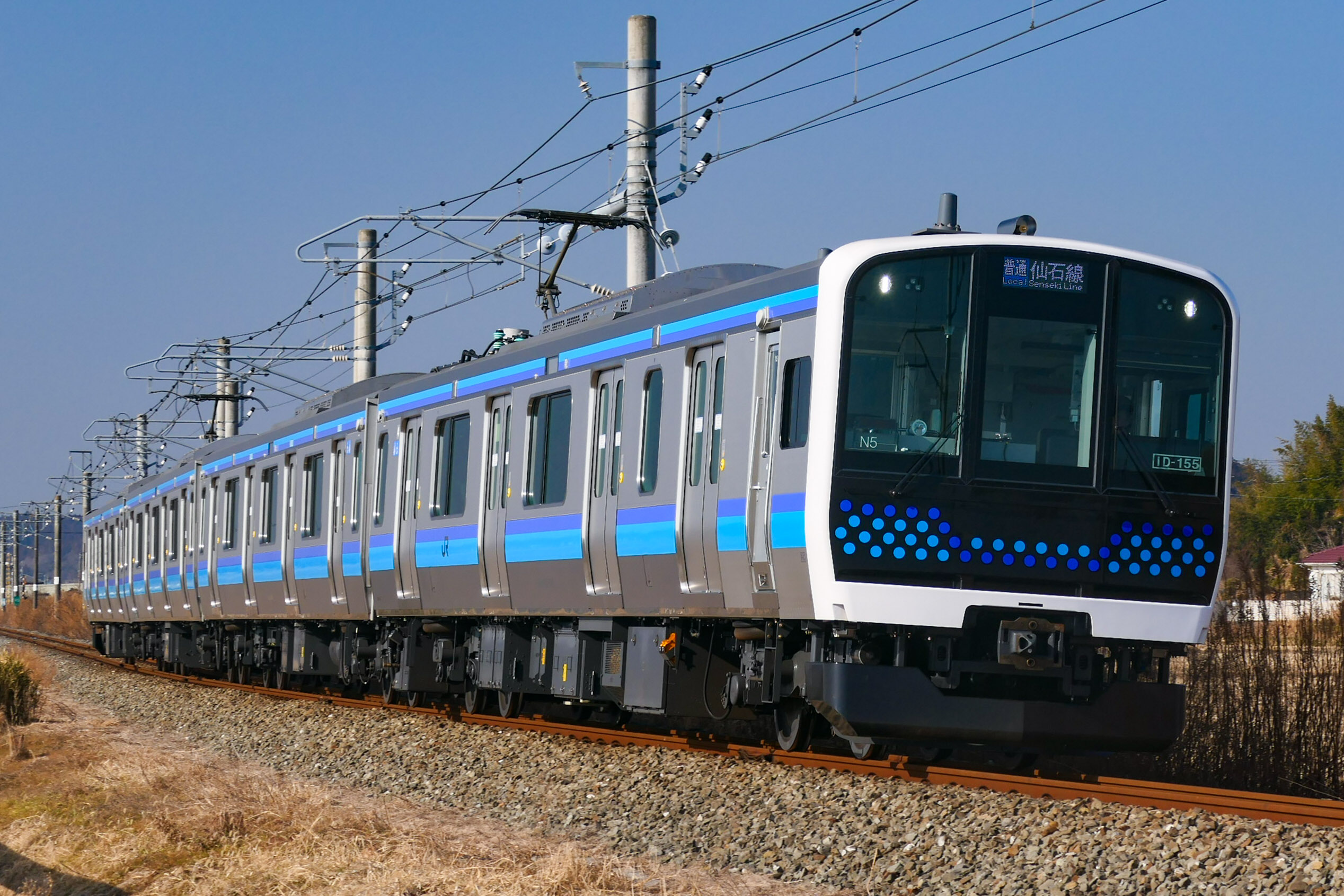
- Senseki Line E131-800 series in February 2026

Overview
- Native name: 仙石線
- Status: Operating
- Owner: JR East
- Locale: Miyagi Prefecture
- Termini: Aoba-dōri Station; Ishinomaki Station
- Stations: 32

Service
- Type: Heavy rail
- System: JR East
- Operator(s): JR East, JR Freight
- Rolling stock: E131 series; HB-E210 series

History
- Opened: 5 June 1925; 101 years ago

Technical
- Track length: 50.2 km (31.2 mi)
- Num of tracks: 2 (Aoba-dōri — Higashi-Shiogama), 1 (Higashi-Shiogama — Ishinomaki)
- Track gauge: 1,067 mm (3 ft 6 in)
- Electrification: 1,500 V DC
- Operating speed: 95 km/h (59 mph)
Route map

The Senseki Line (仙石線, Senseki-sen) is a railway line in Miyagi Prefecture, Japan, owned and operated by the East Japan Railway Company (JR East). It connects Aoba-dōri Station in Sendai to Ishinomaki Station in Ishinomaki, and provides access to the central coast areas of Miyagi Prefecture, including the Matsushima area.

The Senseki Line connects with the Sendai Subway Namboku Line at Aoba-dōri Station; the Tōhoku Shinkansen, the Tōhoku Main Line and the Senzan Line at Sendai Station; and the Ishinomaki Line in Ishinomaki. The name Senseki (仙石) comes from the combination of the first kanji of Sendai (仙台) and Ishinomaki (石巻), the two cities that the Senseki Line connects. It is the only line in the Sendai area with DC overhead electrification.

== Basic data ==
- Operators, distances:
  - East Japan Railway Company (Services and tracks)
    - Aoba-dōri — Ishinomaki: 50.2 km / 31.2 mi.
  - Japan Freight Railway Company (Services and tracks)
    - Rikuzen-Yamashita — Ishinomaki-Minato: 1.8 km / 1.1 mi.
  - Japan Freight Railway Company (Services)
    - Rikuzen-Yamashita — Ishinomaki: 1.4 km / 0.9 mi.
- Stations:
  - Passenger stations: 31
  - Freight terminals: 1 (Ishinomaki-Minato)
- Tracks:
  - Double-track: Aoba-dōri — Higashi-Shiogama
  - Single-track: Higashi-Shiogama — Ishinomaki
- Electrification: Whole line (1,500 V DC)
- Railway signalling:
  - Aoba-dōri — Higashi-shiogama: ATACS(≈ETCS Level 3)
  - Higasi-Shiogama — Ishinomaki: ATS-Ps
- CTC center: Miyagino Operation Control Center

== Services ==
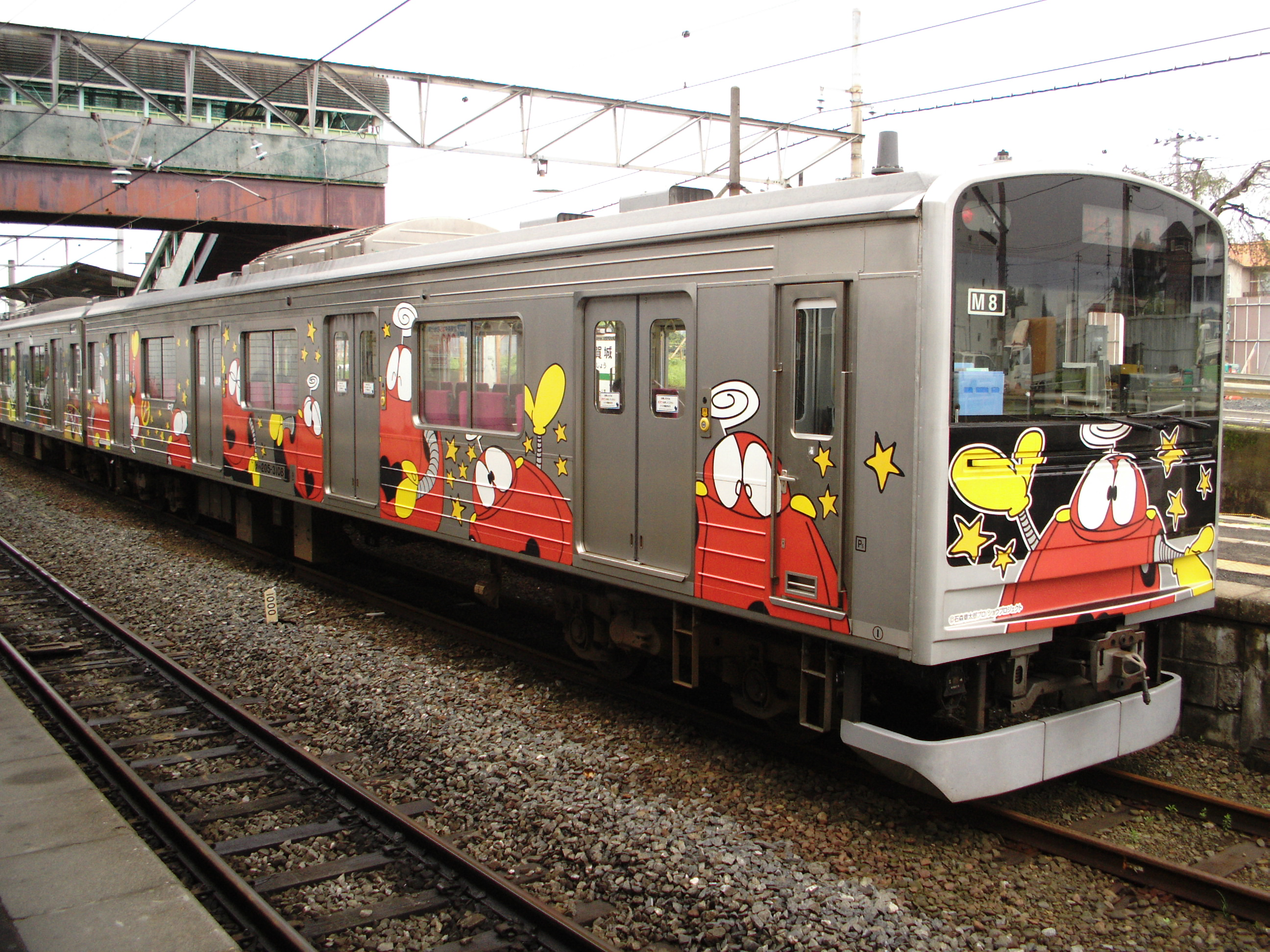
"Mangattan Liner" 205 series train, July 2006

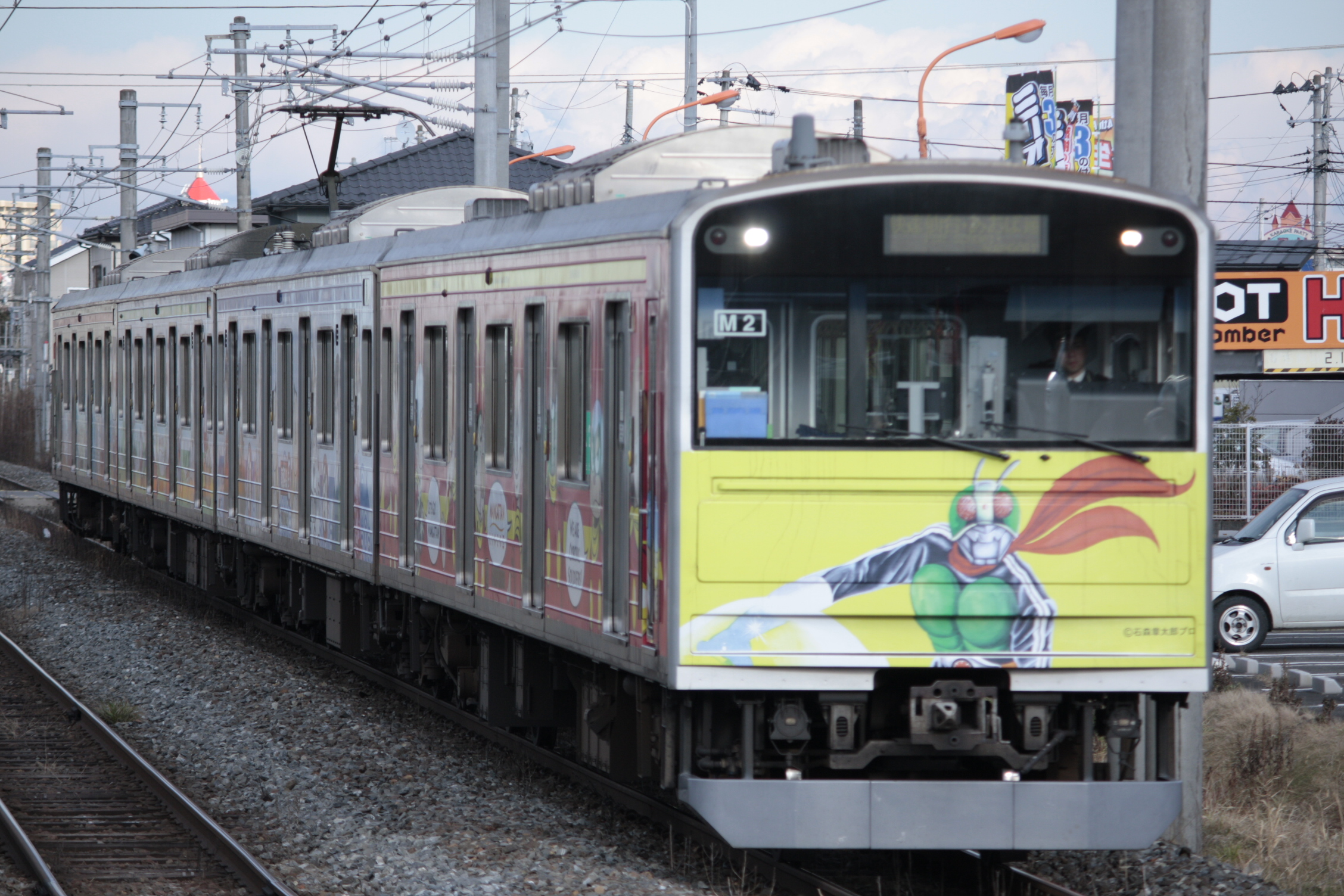
"Mangattan Liner II" 205 series train, January 2009

Prior to the partial suspension of services by the 2011 earthquake and tsunami, all trains originated from Aoba-dōri Station, with most running to Tagajō or Higashi-Shiogama. Local trains and rapid service trains that ran the entire length of the line operated at 30-minute intervals. When the line was fully recovered in 2015, rapid services were switched to the route via the Senseki-Tōhoku Line. Therefore, under the 2015 timetable, the section between Aoba-dōri and Takagimachi is served only by local trains.

At Sendai Station, the line crosses under the Tōhoku Main Line and its platforms, similar to the situation with the Keiyō Line in Tokyo and the Chikuhi Line in Hakata (which connects via the Fukuoka Airport Subway Line).

The segment from Aoba-dōri to Higashi-Shiogama is a crucial part of Sendai's transportation system and gets very crowded during peak periods, with headways as short as 4 minutes. During non-peak times, 3–5 trains run per hour. Between Higashi-Shiogama and Ishinomaki, two trains run per hour.

In addition to all-station local trains, limited-stop rapid and special rapid services run between Takagimachi and Ishinomaki. Between Sendai and Takagimachi, rapid and special rapid services operate on the Senseki-Tōhoku Line. Special rapid services only stop at Yamoto Station, while rapid services also stop at Nobiru, Rikuzen-Ono, Rikuzen-Akai, Hebita, and Rikuzen-Yamashita Stations.

A "Mangattan Train" operates on the Senseki Line, with a livery featuring manga characters by local artist Shotaro Ishinomori.

== Stations ==
All stations are in Miyagi Prefecture.

| Name | Japanese | Station (km) | Distance (km) | Rapid Service | Special Rapid Service | Transfers | Location |
|---|---|---|---|---|---|---|---|
| Aoba-dōri | あおば通 | | 0.0 | No service | | ■ Sendai Subway Namboku Line ■ Sendai Subway Tōzai Line | Aoba-ku, Sendai |
| Sendai | 仙台 | 0.5 | 0.5 | ● | ● | Tōhoku Shinkansen Akita Shinkansen ■ Tōhoku Main Line ■ Senzan Line ■ Jōban Line ■ Sendai Subway Namboku Line ■ Sendai Subway Tōzai Line Sendai Airport Line | Miyagino-ku, Sendai |
| Tsutsujigaoka | 榴ヶ岡 | 0.8 | 1.3 | Via Senseki-Tōhoku Line | | | Miyagino-ku, Sendai |
| Miyaginohara | 宮城野原 | 1.1 | 2.4 | Via Senseki-Tōhoku Line | | | Miyagino-ku, Sendai |
| Rikuzen-Haranomachi | 陸前原ノ町 | 0.8 | 3.2 | Via Senseki-Tōhoku Line | | | Miyagino-ku, Sendai |
| Nigatake | 苦竹 | 0.8 | 4.0 | Via Senseki-Tōhoku Line | | | Miyagino-ku, Sendai |
| Kozurushinden | 小鶴新田 | 1.6 | 5.6 | Via Senseki-Tōhoku Line | | | Miyagino-ku, Sendai |
| Fukudamachi | 福田町 | 2.1 | 7.7 | Via Senseki-Tōhoku Line | | | Miyagino-ku, Sendai |
| Rikuzen-Takasago | 陸前高砂 | 0.9 | 8.6 | Via Senseki-Tōhoku Line | | | Miyagino-ku, Sendai |
| Nakanosakae | 中野栄 | 1.7 | 10.3 | Via Senseki-Tōhoku Line | | | Miyagino-ku, Sendai |
| Tagajō | 多賀城 | 2.3 | 12.6 | Via Senseki-Tōhoku Line | | | Tagajō |
| Geba | 下馬 | 1.8 | 14.4 | Via Senseki-Tōhoku Line | | | Tagajō |
| Nishi-Shiogama | 西塩釜 | 0.8 | 15.2 | Via Senseki-Tōhoku Line | | approx. 1 km from ■ Tōhoku Main Line Shiogama Station. | Shiogama |
| Hon-Shiogama | 本塩釜 | 0.8 | 16.0 | Via Senseki-Tōhoku Line | | | Shiogama |
| Higashi-Shiogama | 東塩釜 | 1.2 | 17.2 | Via Senseki-Tōhoku Line | | | Shiogama |
| Rikuzen-Hamada | 陸前浜田 | 3.1 | 20.3 | Via Senseki-Tōhoku Line | | | Rifu |
| Matsushima-Kaigan | 松島海岸 | 2.9 | 23.2 | Via Senseki-Tōhoku Line | | approx. 2 km from ■ Tōhoku Main Line Matsushima Station. | Matsushima |
| Takagimachi | 高城町 | 2.3 | 25.5 | ● | ● | approx. 1 km from ■ Tōhoku Main Line Matsushima Station. | Matsushima |
| Tetaru | 手樽 | 1.8 | 27.3 | | | | | | Matsushima |
| Rikuzen-Tomiyama | 陸前富山 | 1.3 | 28.6 | | | | | | Matsushima |
| Rikuzen-Ōtsuka | 陸前大塚 | 2.2 | 30.8 | | | | | | Higashimatsushima |
| Tōna | 東名 | 1.4 | 32.2 | | | | | | Higashimatsushima |
| Nobiru | 野蒜 | 1.2 | 33.4 | ● | | | | Higashimatsushima |
| Rikuzen-Ono | 陸前小野 | 2.6 | 36.0 | ● | | | | Higashimatsushima |
| Kazuma | 鹿妻 | 1.6 | 37.6 | | | | | | Higashimatsushima |
| Yamoto | 矢本 | 2.6 | 40.2 | ● | ● | | Higashimatsushima |
| Higashi-Yamoto | 東矢本 | 1.4 | 41.6 | | | | | | Higashimatsushima |
| Rikuzen-Akai | 陸前赤井 | 1.5 | 43.1 | ● | | | | Higashimatsushima |
| Ishinomakiayumino | 石巻あゆみ野 | 2.1 | 45.2 | ▲ | | | | Ishinomaki |
| Hebita | 蛇田 | 1.4 | 46.6 | ● | | | | Ishinomaki |
| Rikuzen-Yamashita | 陸前山下 | 1.0 | 47.6 | ● | | | | Ishinomaki |
| Ishinomaki | 石巻 | 1.4 | 49.0 | ● | ● | ■ Ishinomaki Line | Ishinomaki |

The distances shown above are as of 30 May 2015 following the rerouting of the section between Rikuzen-Ōtsuka and Rikuzen-Ono, by which the section was shortened by 1.2 kilometers.

== Rolling stock ==
- HB-E210 series 2-car hybrid DMUs
- E131-800 series 4-car EMUs

New HB-E210 series 2-car hybrid diesel multiple unit (DMU) trains were introduced on the line from 30 May 2015 between Takagimachi and Ishinomaki following the start of new Senseki-Tohoku Line services using a newly built link connecting with the Tohoku Main Line at Shiogama.

New E131-800 series trains were introduced on the line from 1 December 2025 to replace the 205-3100 series.

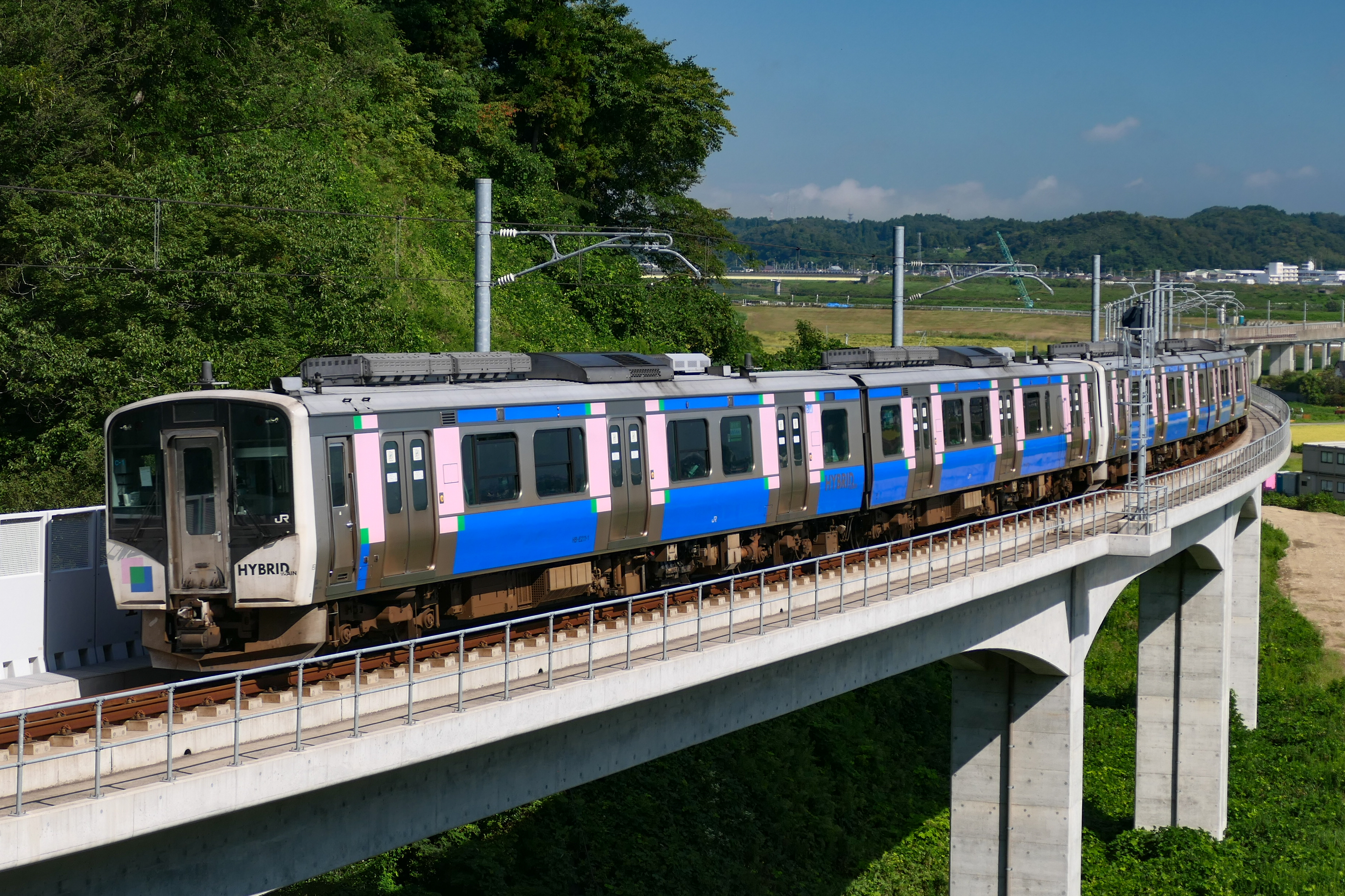
An HB-E210 series hybrid DMU

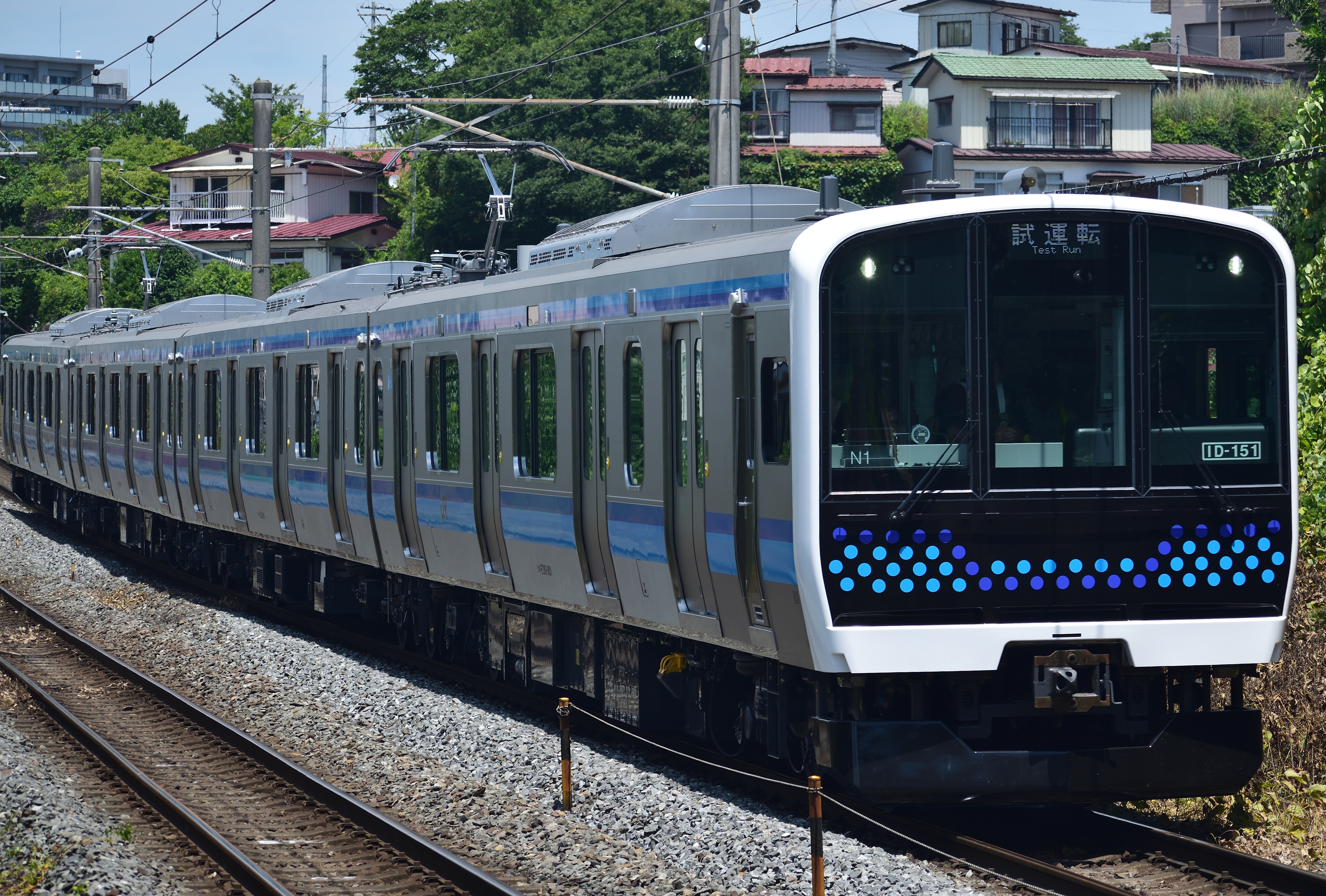
An E131-800 series EMU

=== Former rolling stock ===
- 72 series (introduced 1974)
- 79 series (introduced 1974)
- 103 series (1979–2004, 2006–2009)
- 105 series (March 1987 – 1998)
- 205-3100 series 4-car EMUs (2002–2026)
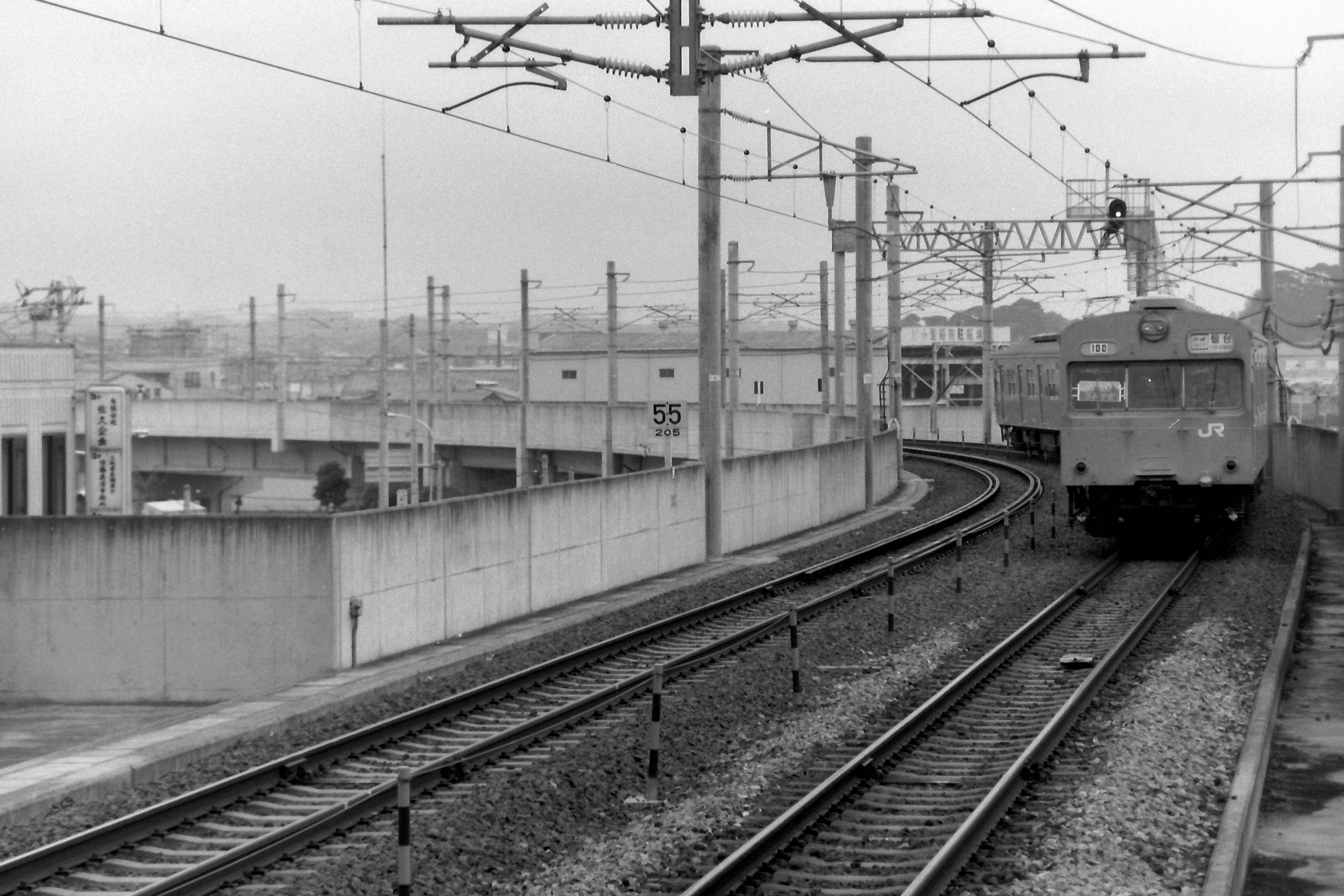
A Senseki Line 103 series approaching Hon-Shiogama Station

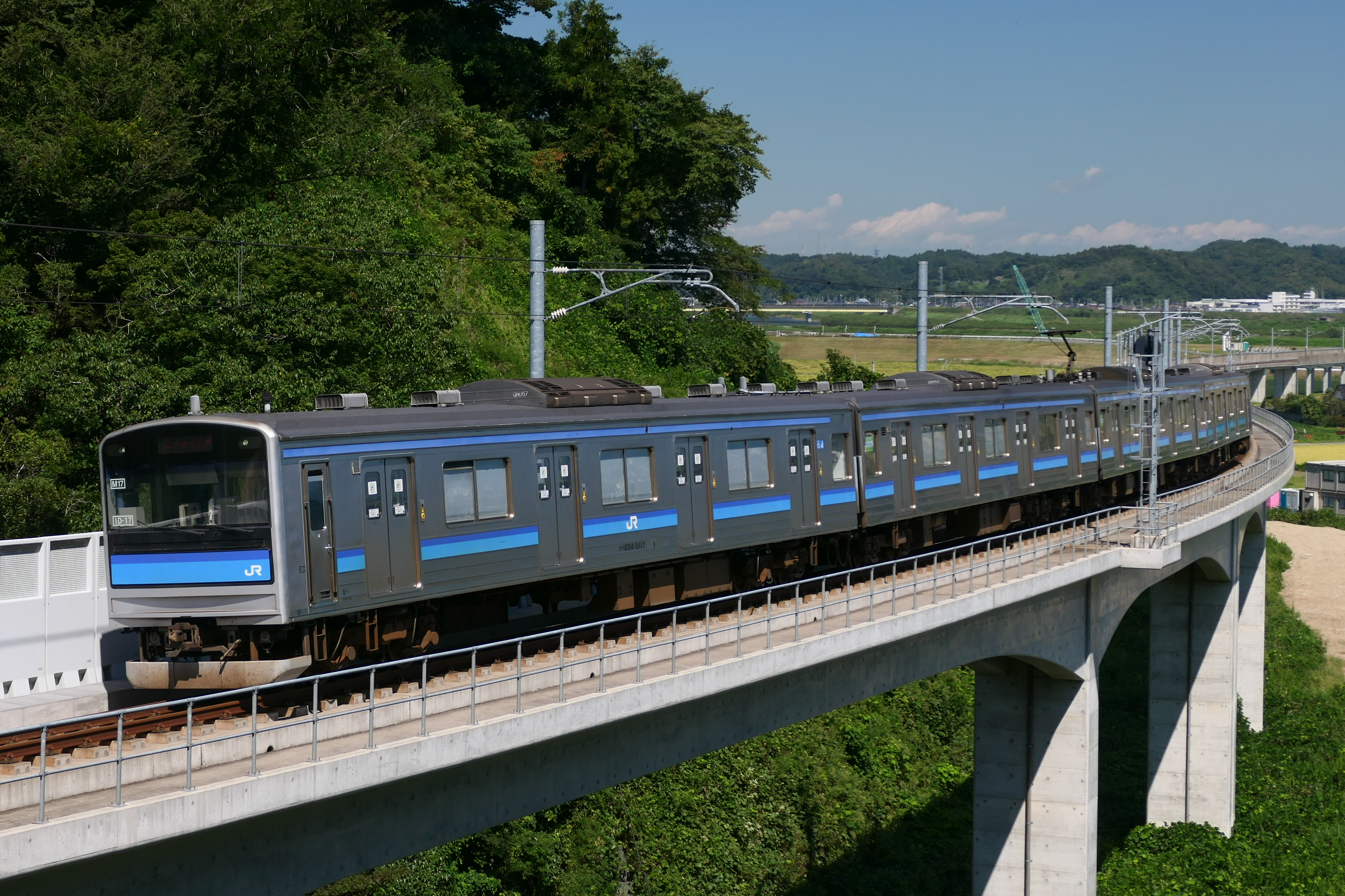
A 205‑3100 series EMU

== History ==
The Miyagi Electric Railway opened the line in sections beginning 1925. In 1944 it was acquired by Japanese National Railways..

Individual opening dates are given in the timeline section below. The Rikuzen-Haranomachi to Nishi-Shiogama section was double-tracked between 1968 and 1969, and extended to Higashi-Shiogama in 1981.

In 2000, the surface section between Rikuzen-Haranomachi and Sendai was replaced by a double-track underground line, with a new section to Aoba-dori to connect to the Sendai subway.

On 26 March 2016, a new station, Ishinomakiayumino Station, located between Rikuzen-Akai and Hebita, was opened.

=== Disaster and reconstruction, 2011–2015 ===
Service was halted after the 2011 Tōhoku earthquake and tsunami as several trains, stations, and sections of the line were destroyed, heavily damaged, and flooded. Service for the first 26 kilometers (16 mi) of the line from Sendai was expected to be restored by the end of May 2011. By mid-July, the Sendai–Matsushima-Kaigan and Yamoto–Ishinomaki sections returned to service, although the latter segment was with diesel trains due to the loss of the power substation. The remainder of the line between Matsushima-Kaigan and Yamoto was obliterated by the tsunami.

Between March and October 2012, services resumed on all sections of the line except between Takagimachi and Rikuzen-Ono section; service there did not resume until 30 May 2015.

Along with the above reopening in 2015, a new 400m long link, which cost approximately 2 billion yen, was constructed from between Shiogama and Matsushima on the Tōhoku Main Line to a point between Matsushima-Kaigan and Takagimachi Station on the Senseki Line. This link allowed through-running services from the Tohoku Main Line to the Senseki Line, and cut approximately 10 minutes off the journey time between Sendai and Ishinomaki.

== Timeline ==
- 5 June 1925: Miyagi Electric Railway (later Senseki Line): Sendai – Nishi-Shiogama.
- 1 January 1926: Miyaginohara Station opens.
- 14 April 1926: Nishi-Shiogama – Hon-Shiogama section opens.
- 18 April 1927: Hon-Shiogama – Matsushima-Kōen (later Matsushima-Kaigan Station) section opens.
- 10 April 1928: Matsushima-Kōen – Rikuzen-Ono section opens.
- 15 May 1928: Nigatake Station opens.
- 22 November 1928: Rikuzen-Ono – Ishinomaki section opens, connecting Sendai to Ishinomaki.
- 1 June 1929: Kazuma Station opens.
- 23 October 1931: Nobiru Station becomes Tōhoku-Suma Station.
- 1 December 1931: Tōna Station opens.
- 8 January 1932: Ishinomaki station becomes Miyaden-Ishinomaki Station.
- 1 August 1932: Geba Station opens.
- 1 February 1939: Miyaden-Yamashita Station (later Rikuzen-Yamashita Station) opens.
- 7 November 1939: Miyaden-Yamashita – Kama (later Ishinomaki Port Station) freight connection opens.
- 1 May 1944: Miyagi Electric Railway is nationalized, becomes the Senseki Line; Higashi-Nanabanchō Station becomes Sendai Higashi-Guchi Station, Hamada Station becomes Rikuzen-Hamada Station, Matsushima-Kōen becomes Matsushima-Kaigan Station, Tomiyama becomes Rikuzen-Tomiyama Station, Ōtsuka becomes Rikuzen-Ōtsuka Station, Tōhoku-Suma becomes Nobiru Station, and Miyaden-Ishinomaki becomes Ishinomaki Station.
- 1 June 1952: Sendai – Sendai Higashi-Guchi section stops operation.
- 26 September 1952: Sendai – Sendai Higashi-Gushi section abolished.
- 1957: Rapid trains begin operation.
- 23 February 1968: Track doubled on Fukudamachi – Tagajō section.
- 19 March 1968: Track doubled on Rikuzen-Haranomachi – Fukudamachi section.
- 11 October 1968: Kama – Ishinomaki-Futō freight connection opens
- 26 September 1969: Track doubled on Tagajō to Nishi-Shiogama section.
- 1 April 1971: Kama – Ishinomaki-Minato freight connection abolished.
- 15 March 1972: Kama Station becomes Ishinomaki-Minato Station.
- 1974: 72 series and 79 series trains begin operation.
- 1 October 1979: 103 series trains begin operation.
- 1 April 1981: Nakanosakae Station opens.
- 1 November 1981: Nishi-Shiogama – Higashi-Shiogama section elevated, double-tracked; Hon-Shiogama Station and Higashi-Shiogama Station moved.
- 2 October 1983: New weekend schedule introduced.
- 31 March 1987: Higashi-Yamoto Station opens.
- 1 April 1987: Senseki Line becomes part of the East Japan Railway Company (JR East).
- 13 March 1988: Rapid trains renamed Umikaze; scheduling changes.
- 21 July 1990: Ishinomaki and Senseki Lines' Ishinomaki stations are merged.
- 1 November 1999: Ishinomaki-Minato – Ishinomaki-Futō; freight connection abolished.

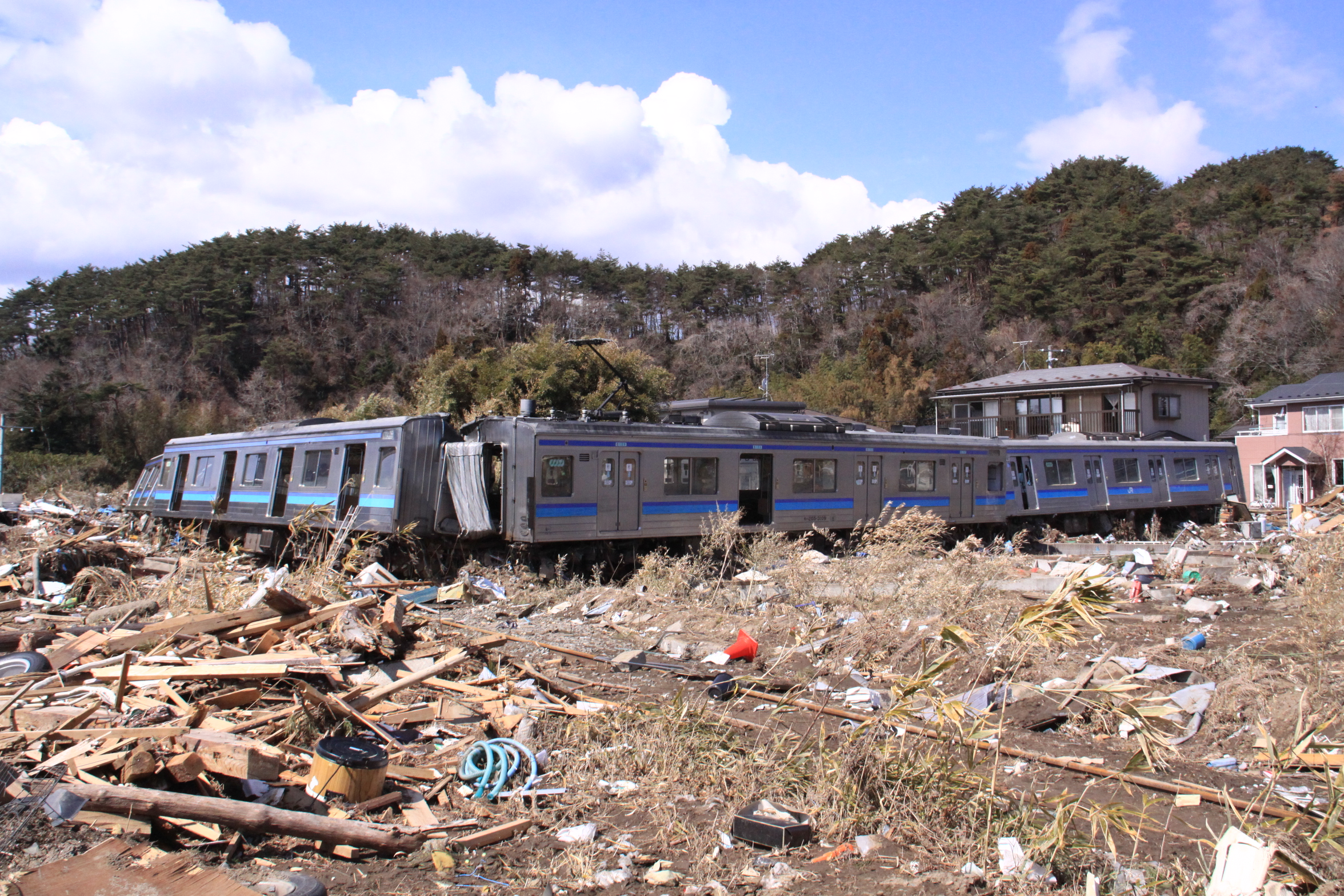
Senseki Line 205 series EMU damaged by tsunami, March 2011

- 11 March 2000: Sendai – Rikuzen-Haranomachi section moved underground; Aoba-dōri – Sendai section added.
- 5 November 2002: 205-3100 series trains begin operation.
- July 2004: Last remaining 103 series trains withdrawn.
- 13 March 2004: Kozurushinden Station opens.
- 16 October 2004: "Umikaze" name is discontinued; weekday and Saturday schedules are merged.
- 16 March 2005: Nishi-Shiogama Station becomes unstaffed.
- November 2006: One 4-car 103 series train is brought out of storage and reinstated into service.
- 21 October 2009: JR East's last remaining 103 series train is withdrawn from service.
- 11 March 2011: Two Senseki Line trains were derailed and badly damaged by the 2011 Tōhoku earthquake and tsunami.
- 2015: Services are restored over the entire length of the line.
- 26 March 2016: Ishinomakiayumino Station opens.
