= Tetaru Station =

Railway station in Matsushima, Miyagi Prefecture, Japan

Tetaru Station 手樽駅
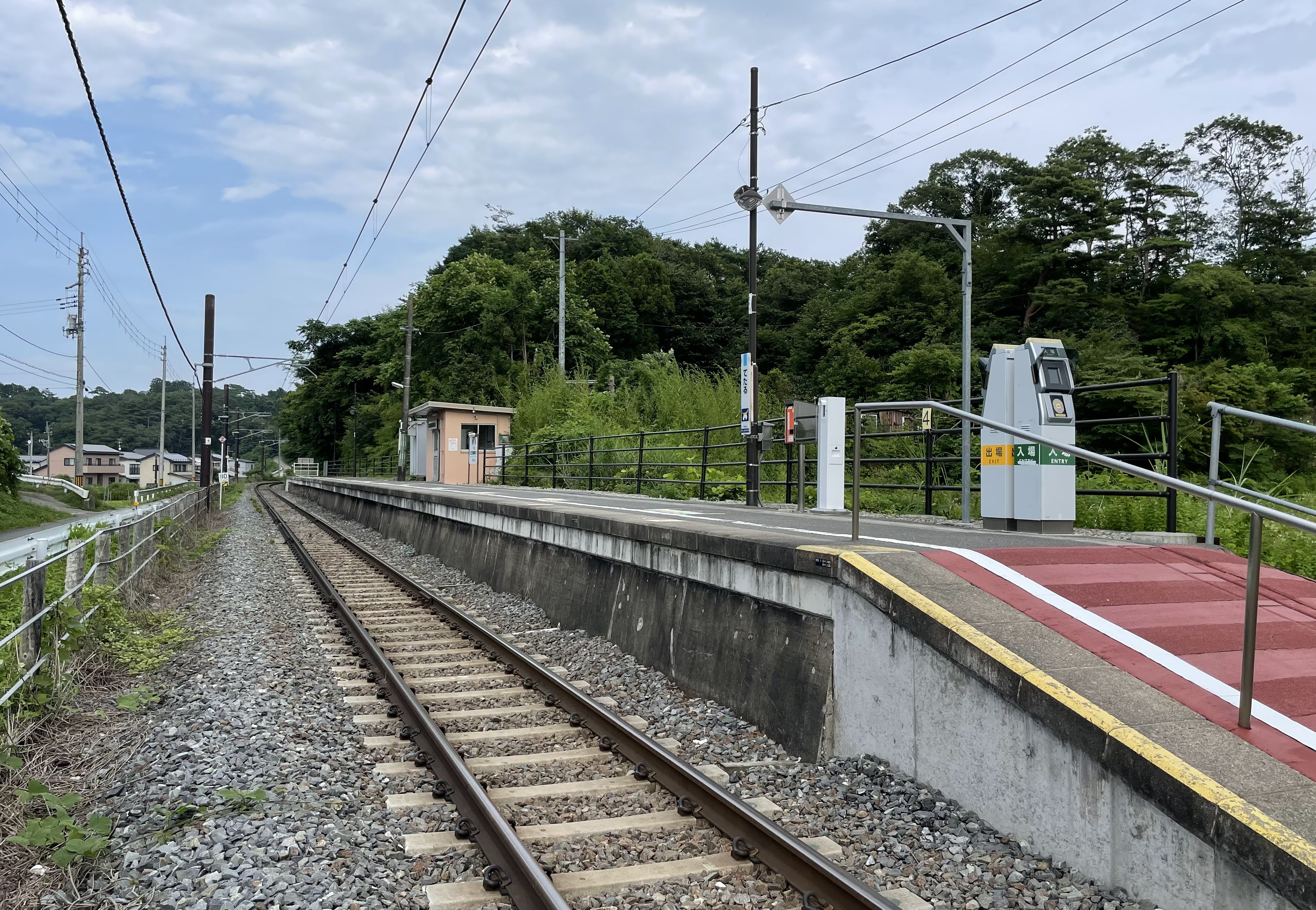
- Tetaru Station, July 2022

General information
- Location: Tetaru, Matsushima-cho, Miyagi-gun, Miyagi-ken 981-0211; Japan
- Coordinates: 38.3872°N 141.0931°E
- Distance: 27.3 km from Aoba-dōri
- Platforms: 1 side platform
- Tracks: 1

Other information
- Status: Unstaffed
- Website: Official website

History
- Opened: April 10, 1928
- Rebuilt: 2015

Passengers
- FY2004: 14 daily

Services
Preceding station	JR East	Following station
Takagimachi towards Aoba-dori	Senseki Line	Rikuzen-Tomiyama towards Ishinomaki
Location
- Location within Miyagi Prefecture Location within Japan

Tetaru Station (手樽駅, Tetaru-eki) is a railway station in the town of Matsushima, Miyagi Prefecture, Japan, operated by East Japan Railway Company (JR East).

== Lines ==
Tetaru Station is served by the Senseki Line. It is located 27.3 rail kilometers from the terminus of the Senseki Line at Aoba-dōri Station.

== Station layout ==
Tetaru Station has one side platform serving a single bi-directional track. There is no station building. The station is unattended.

== History ==
Tetaru Station opened on April 10, 1928 as a station on the Miyagi Electric Railway. The line was nationalized on May 1, 1944. The station was absorbed into the JR East network upon the privatization of JNR on April 1, 1987. The station was closed from March 11, 2011 due to damage to the line associated with the 2011 Tōhoku earthquake and tsunami, and services replaced by a provisional bus rapid transit service. The station was reopened on 30 May 2015.

== Surrounding area ==
- Miyagi Prefectural Route 27

== See also ==
- List of railway stations in Japan
