= Rikuzen-Ōtsuka Station =

Railway station in Higashimatsushima, Miyagi Prefecture, Japan

Rikuzen-Ōtsuka Station 陸前大塚駅
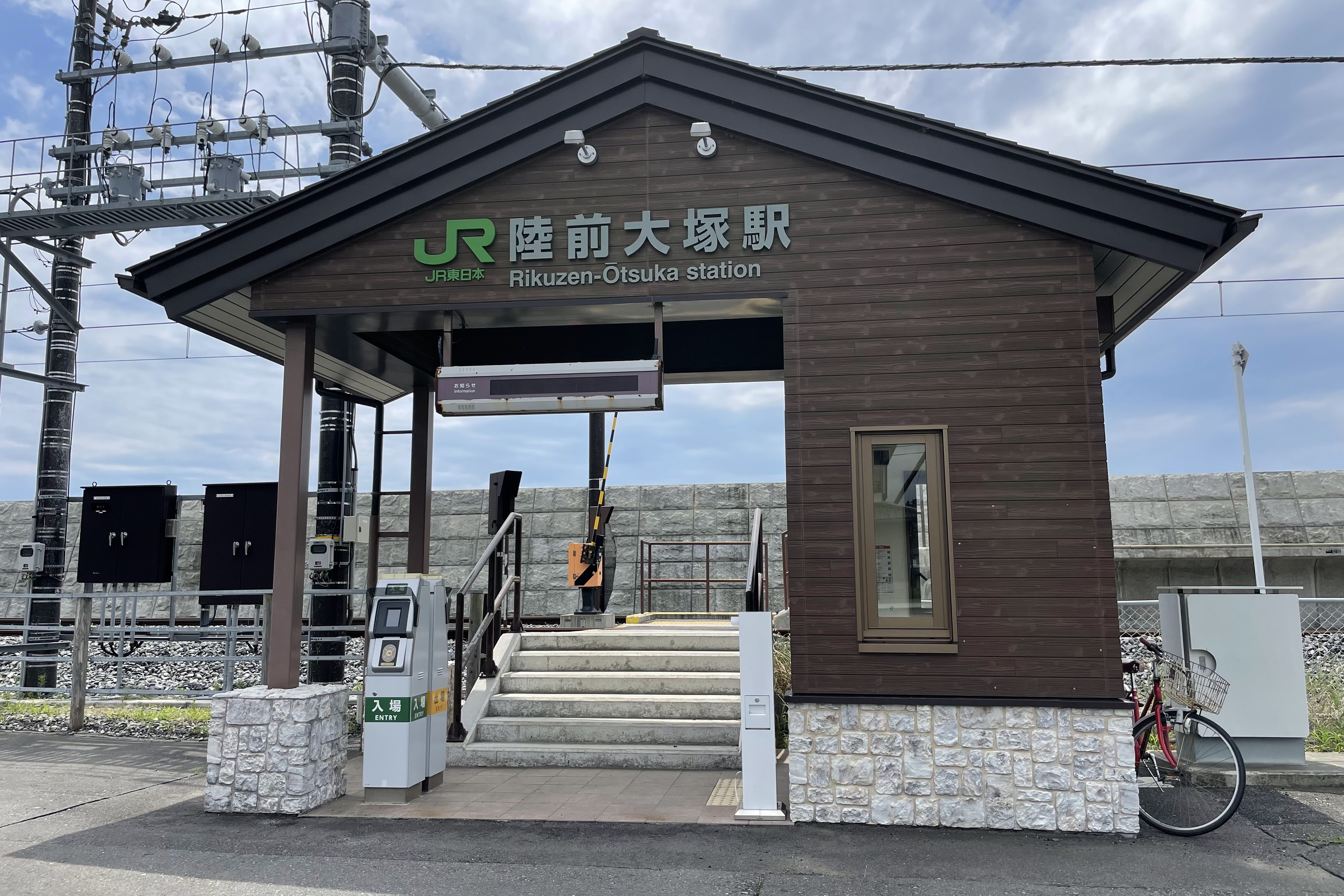
- Rikuzen-Ōtsuka Station, July 2022

General information
- Location: Ōtsuka, Higashimatsushima-shi, Miyagi-ken 981-0414; Japan
- Coordinates: 38.3789°N 141.1294°E
- Lines: ■ Senseki Line; ■ Senseki-Tōhoku Line
- Distance: 30.8 km from Aoba-dōri
- Platforms: 1 island platform
- Tracks: 2

Other information
- Status: Unstaffed
- Website: Official website

History
- Opened: April 10, 1928
- Rebuilt: 2015
- Former names: Ōtsuka (until 1944)

Services
| Preceding station | JR East | Following station |
|---|---|---|
| Rikuzen-Tomiyama towards Aoba-dori | Senseki Line | Tōna towards Ishinomaki |
Location
- Location within Miyagi Prefecture Location within Japan

Rikuzen-Ōtsuka Station (陸前大塚駅, Rikuzen-Ōtsuka-eki) is a railway station on the Senseki Line in the city of Higashimatsushima, Miyagi, Japan, operated by East Japan Railway Company (JR East). The station was closed between March 2011 and May 2015.

== Lines ==
Rikuzen-Ōtsuka Station is served by the Senseki Line, and is located 30.8 kilometers from the terminus of the line at Aoba-dōri Station. It is also served by trains of the Senseki-Tōhoku Line.

== Station layout ==
The station has one island platform connected to the station building (an open-sided structure containing a ticket machine) by a level crossing. The station is unattended.

=== Platforms ===
| 1 | ■ Senseki Line | for Sendai and Aoba-dōri |
| 2 | ■ Senseki Line | for Yamoto and Ishinomaki |

== History ==
The station opened on April 10, 1928, as Ōtsuka Station (大塚駅) on the Miyagi Electric Railway. The line was nationalized on May 1, 1944, and the station was renamed Rikuzen-Ōtsuka at that time. The station was absorbed into the JR East network upon the privatization of JNR on April 1, 1987. The station was closed from March 11, 2011, due to damage to the line associated with the 2011 Tōhoku earthquake and tsunami, and services were replaced by a provisional bus rapid transit service. The station reopened on 30 May 2015.

== Surrounding area ==
- Miyagi Prefectural Route 27

== See also ==
- List of railway stations in Japan
