= Rikuzen-Tomiyama Station =

Railway station in Matsushima, Miyagi Prefecture, Japan

Rikuzen-Tomiyama Station 陸前富山駅
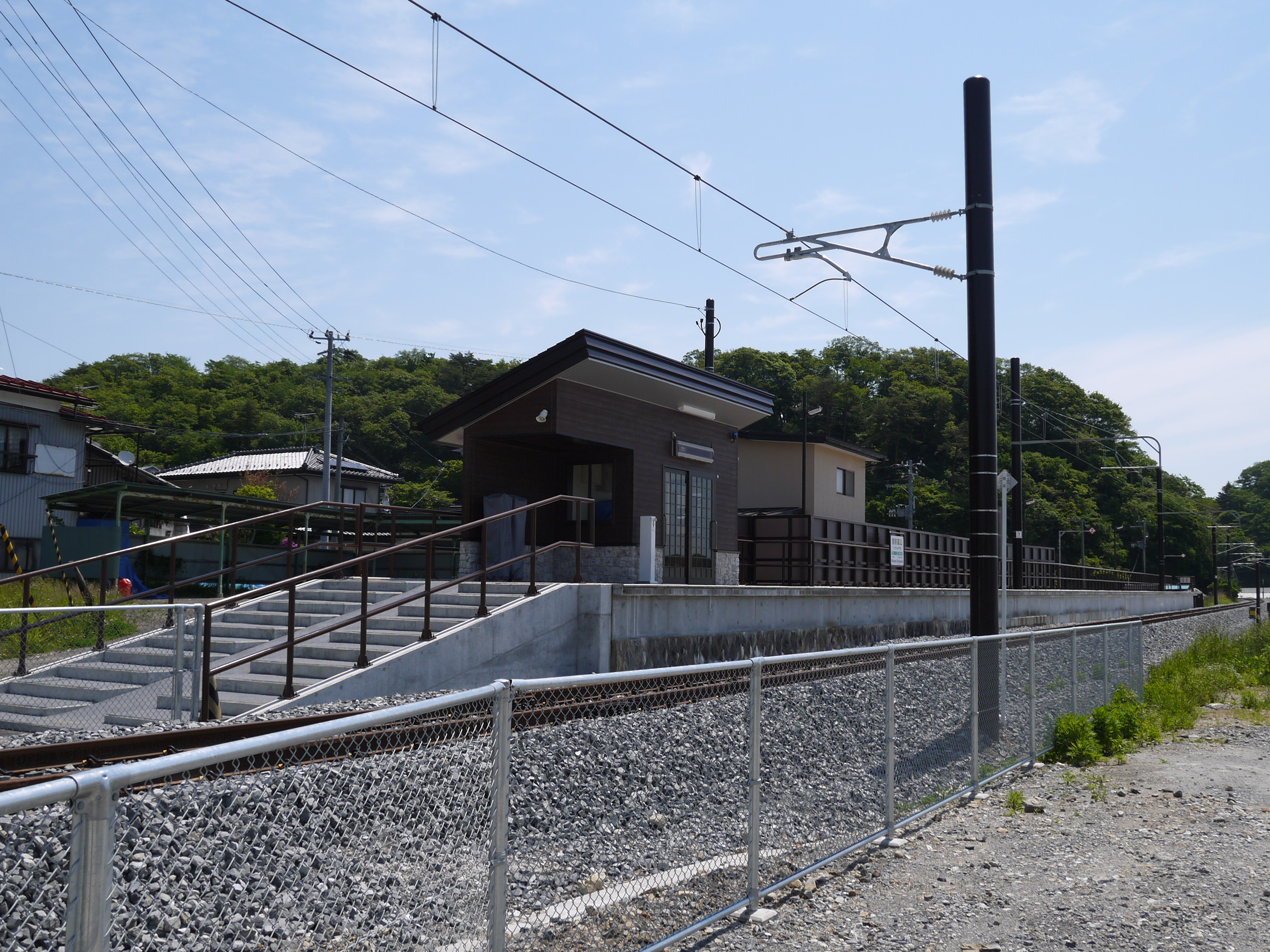
- Rikuzen-Tomiyama Station in May 2015

General information
- Location: Tetaru Hayakawa-Higashi, Matsushima-cho, Miyagi-gun, Miyagi-ken 981-0211; Japan
- Coordinates: 38.3865°N 141.1073°E
- Operator: JR East
- Line: ■ Senseki Line
- Distance: 28.6 km from Aoba-dōri
- Platforms: 1 side platform
- Tracks: 1

Other information
- Status: Unstaffed
- Website: Official website

History
- Opened: April 10, 1928
- Rebuilt: 2015
- Former names: Tomiyama (until 1944)

Services
Preceding station	JR East	Following station
Tetaru towards Aoba-dori	Senseki Line	Rikuzen-Ōtsuka towards Ishinomaki
Location
- Location within Miyagi Prefecture Location within Japan

Rikuzen-Tomiyama Station (陸前富山駅, Rikuzen-Tomiyama-eki) is a railway station in the town of Matsushima, Miyagi Prefecture, Japan, operated by East Japan Railway Company (JR East).

== Lines ==
Rikuzen-Tomiyama Station is served by the Senseki Line, and is located 28.6 kilometers from the terminus of the Senseki Line at Aoba-dōri Station.

== Station layout ==
The station has one side platform serving a single bi-directional track. The station is unattended.

== History ==
The station opened on April 10, 1928, as Tomiyama Station (富山駅) on the Miyagi Electric Railway. The line was nationalized on May 1, 1944 and the station was renamed Rikuzen-Tomiyama at that time. The station was absorbed into the JR East network upon the privatization of JNR on April 1, 1987.

The station was closed from March 11, 2011 due to damage to the line associated with the 2011 Tōhoku earthquake and tsunami, and services replaced by a provisional bus rapid transit service. The station was reopened on 30 May 2015.

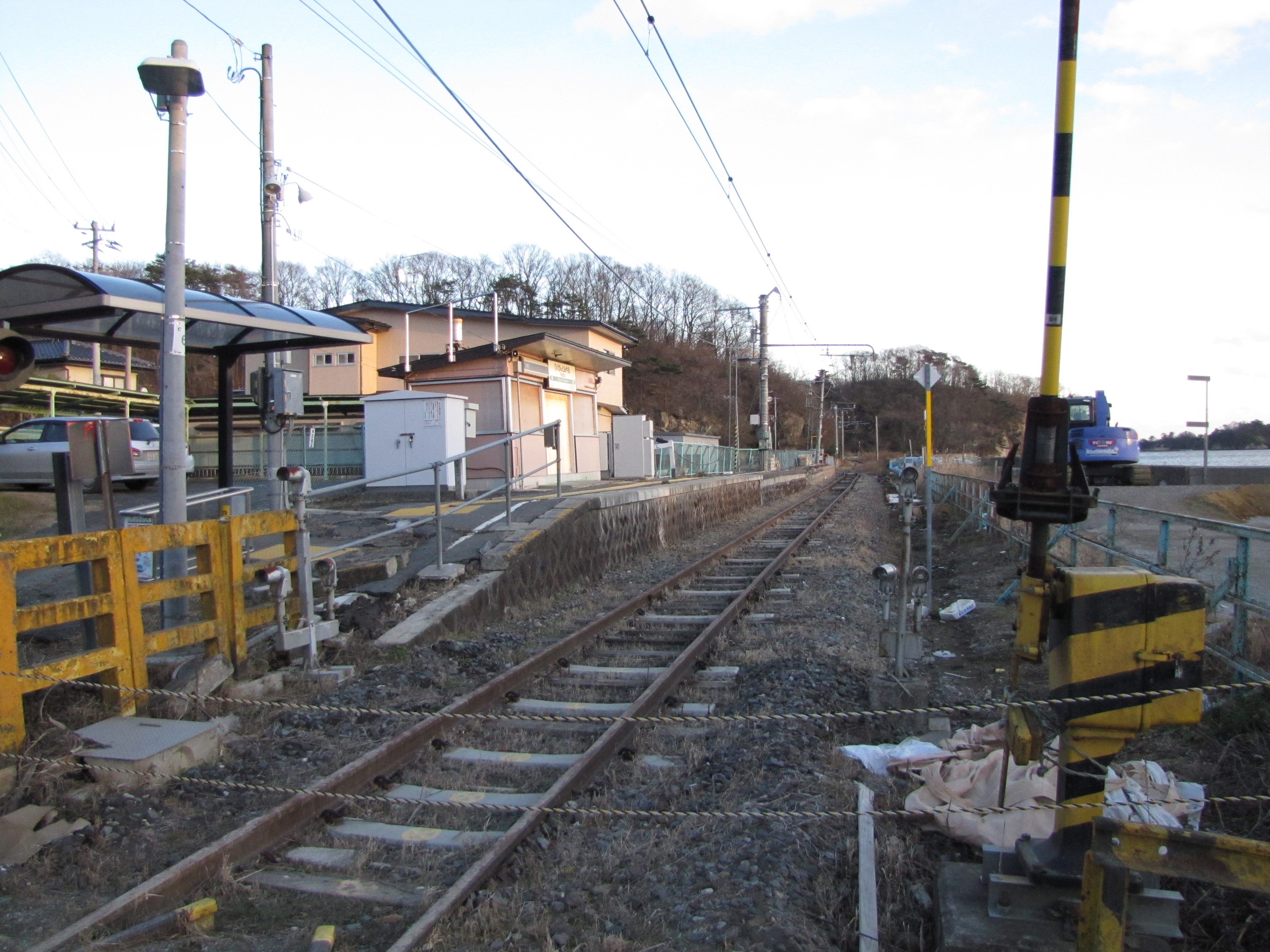
The station in December 2012, while services were suspended

== Surrounding area ==
- Tomiyama Kannon

== See also ==
- List of railway stations in Japan
