= Tōna Station =

Railway station in Higashimatsushima, Miyagi Prefecture, Japan

Tōna Station 東名駅
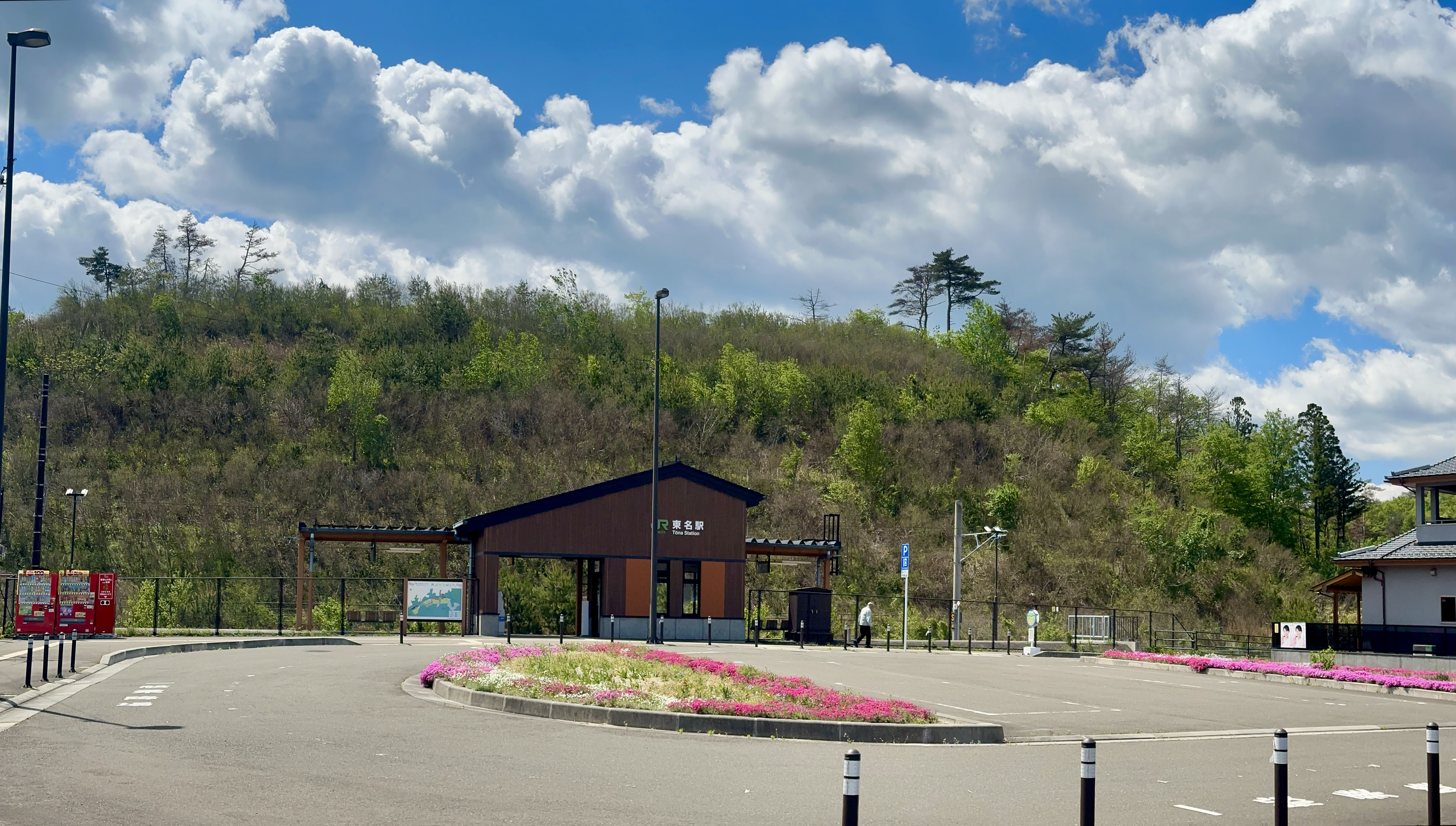
- Tōna Station in May 2026

General information
- Location: Ōtsuka Kitabayashi-shita, Higashimatsushima-shi, Miyagi-ken 981-0411; Japan
- Coordinates: 38°22′31.1″N 141°8′38.3″E
- Operator: JR East
- Line: ■ Senseki Line
- Distance: 32.2 km from Aoba-dōri
- Platforms: 1 side platform
- Tracks: 1

Other information
- Status: Unstaffed
- Website: Official website

History
- Opened: 1 December 1931
- Rebuilt: 2015

Services
Preceding station	JR East	Following station
Rikuzen-Ōtsuka towards Aoba-dori	Senseki Line	Nobiru towards Ishinomaki
Location
- Location within Miyagi Prefecture Location within Japan

Tōna Station (東名駅, Tōna-eki) is a railway station in the city of Higashimatsushima, Miyagi Prefecture, Japan, operated by East Japan Railway Company (JR East).

== Lines ==
The station is served by the Senseki Line. It is located 32.2 kilometers from the terminus of the Senseki Line at Aoba-dōri Station.

== Station layout ==
Tōna Station has one side platform serving a single bi-directional track. The station is unattended.

== History ==
Tōna Station opened on December 1, 1931 as a station on the Miyagi Electric Railway. The line was nationalized on May 1, 1944. The station was absorbed into the JR East network upon the privatization of JNR on April 1, 1987.

The station was destroyed on March 11, 2011 due to damage associated with the 2011 Tōhoku earthquake and tsunami, and services were replaced by provisional bus services. The station reopened on May 30, 2015 on a higher ground where the former community around the station would be reconstructed. Due to the relocation, the distance from Aoba-Dōri was changed from 32.4 kilometers to 32.2 kilometers.

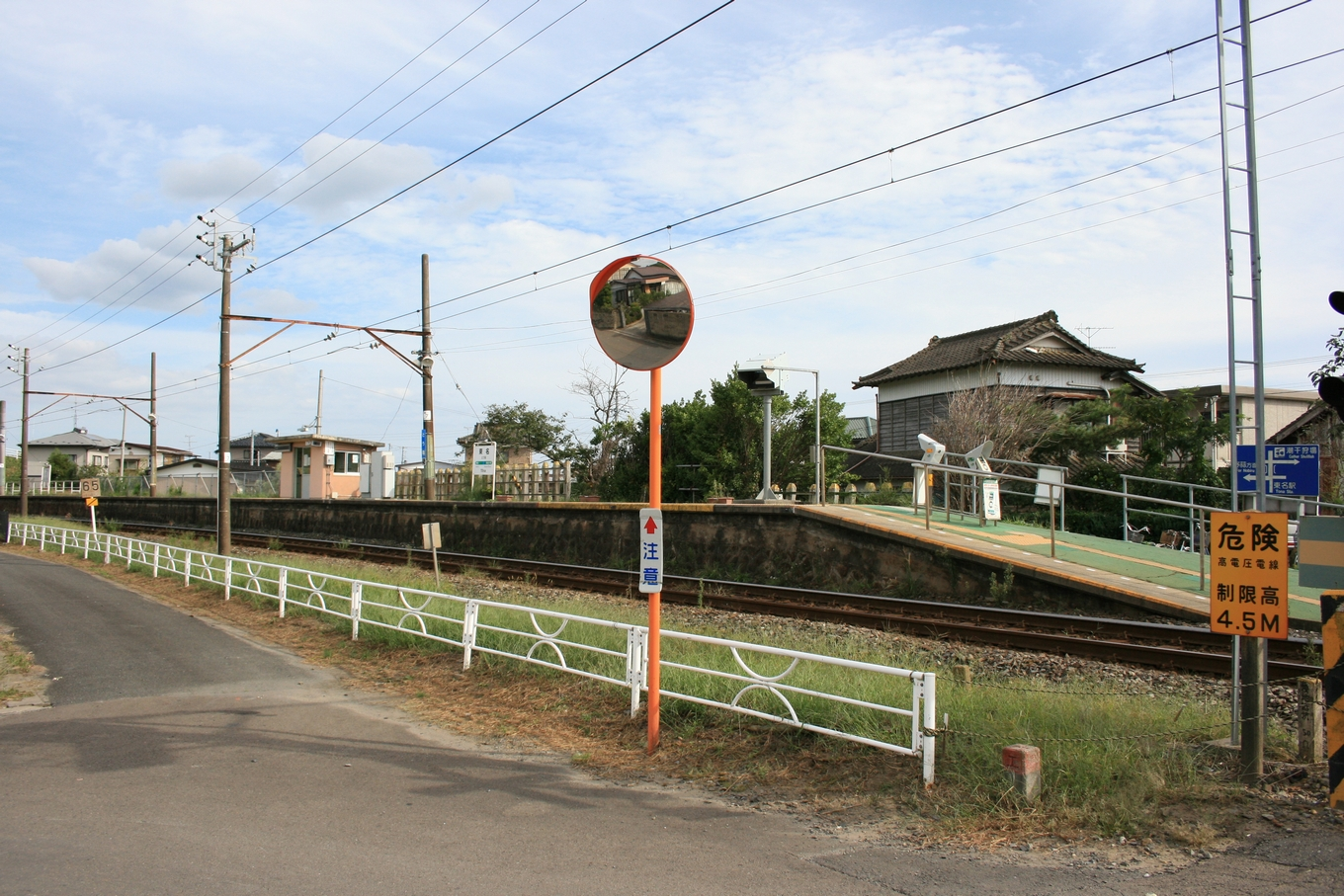
Original station in 2007

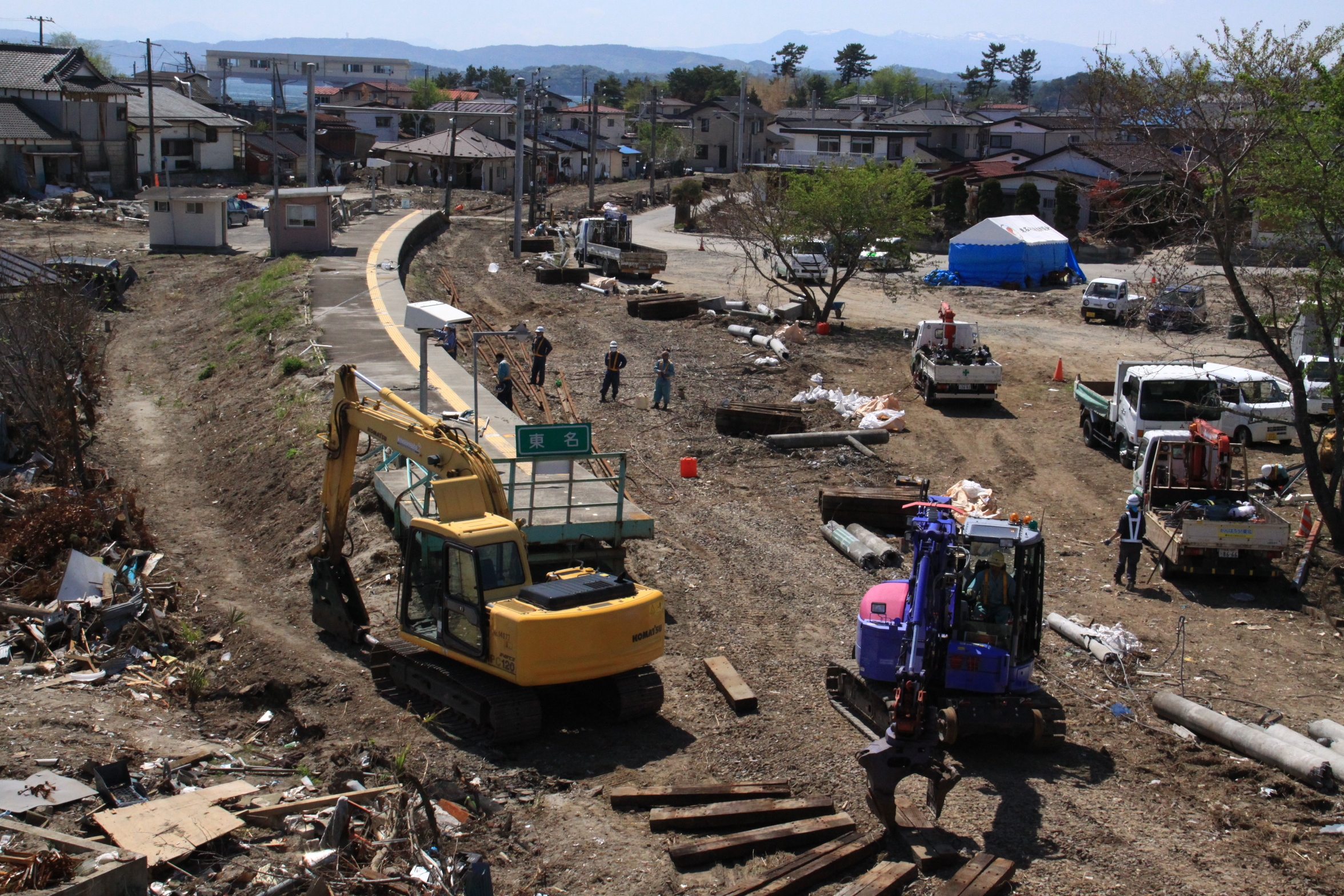
Tōna Station in May 2011 after tsunami damage

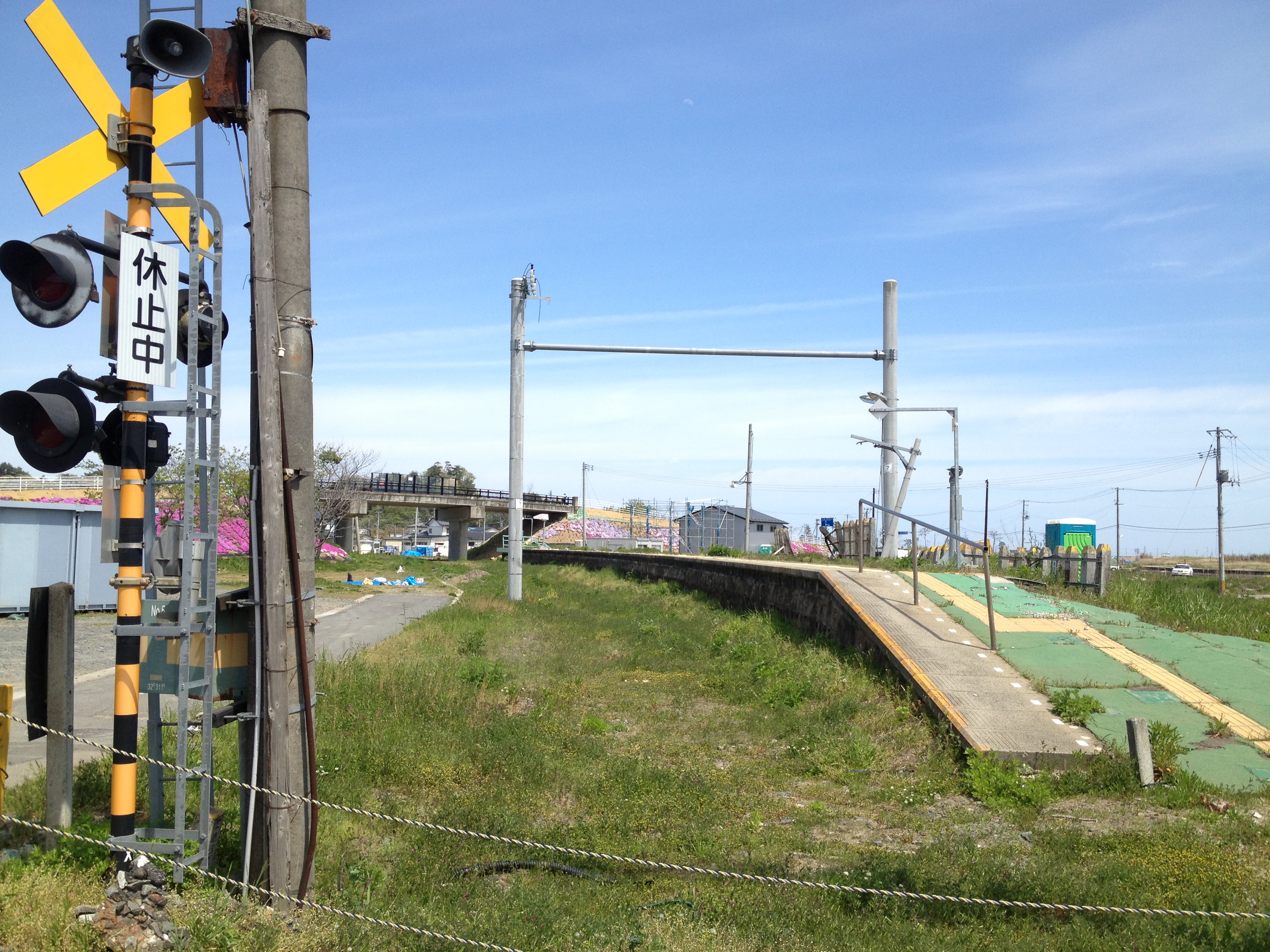
Abandoned platform in May 2013

== Surrounding area ==
- Tōna Post Office
- Tōna beach

== See also ==
- List of railway stations in Japan
