= Rikuzen-Hamada Station =

Railway station in Rifu, Miyagi Prefecture, Japan

Rikuzen-Hamada Station 陸前浜田駅
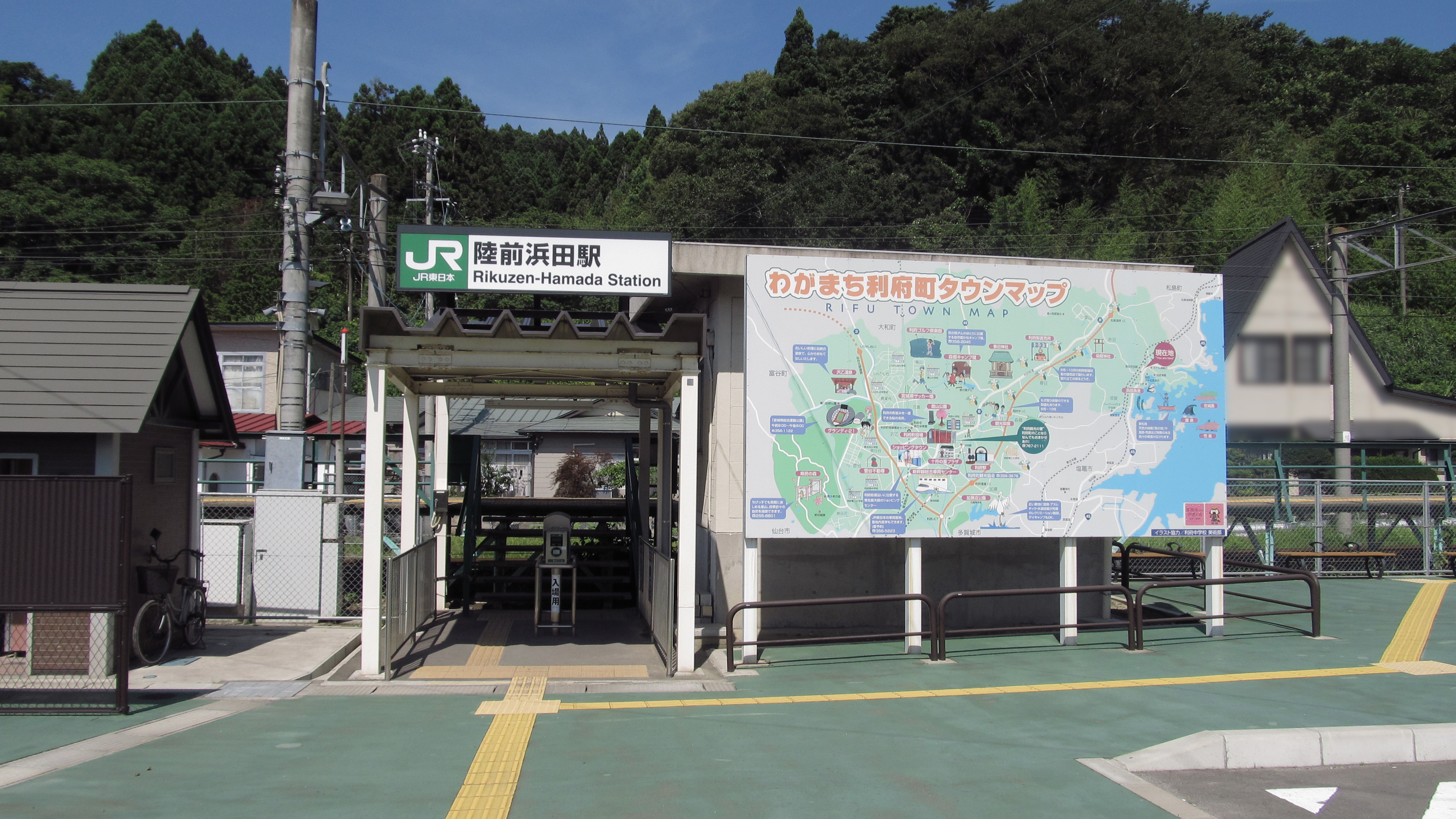
- Rikuzen-Hamada Station, August 2014

General information
- Location: Akanuma Idojiri, Rifu-cho, Miyag-gun, Miyagi-ken 981-0101; Japan
- Coordinates: 38.3506°N 141.0417°E
- Operator: JR East
- Line: ■ Senseki Line
- Distance: 20.3 km from Aoba-dōri
- Platforms: 1 side platform
- Tracks: 1

Other information
- Status: Unstaffed
- Website: Official website

History
- Opened: April 18, 1927
- Former names: Hamada (until 1944)

Services
Preceding station	JR East	Following station
Higashi-Shiogama towards Aoba-dori	Senseki Line	Matsushima-Kaigan towards Ishinomaki
Location
- Location within Miyagi Prefecture Location within Japan

Rikuzen-Hamada Station (陸前浜田駅, Rikuzen-Hamada-eki) is a railway station in the town of Rifu, Miyagi Prefecture, Japan, operated by East Japan Railway Company (JR East).

== Lines ==
Rikuzen-Hamada Station is served by the Senseki Line. It is located 20.3 rail kilometers from the terminus of the Senseki Line at Aoba-dōri Station.

== Station layout ==
The station has one side platform serving a single bi-directional track. The station is unattended.

== History ==
Rikuzen-Hamada Station opened on April 18, 1927 as a Hamada Station (浜田駅, Hamada-eki) on the Miyagi Electric Railway. The line was nationalized on May 1, 1944 and was renamed to its present name on that date. The station was absorbed into the JR East network upon the privatization of JNR on April 1, 1987. The station was closed from March 11 to May 28, 2011 due to damage caused by the tsunami associated with the 2011 Tōhoku earthquake.

== Surrounding area ==
- National Route 45
- Hamada Fishing Port
- Mt. Sokan
- The Tōhoku Main Line track runs parallel here, but the nearest station is in Matsushima.

== See also ==
- List of railway stations in Japan
