= Tagajō Station =

Railway station in Tagajō, Miyagi Prefecture, Japan

Tagajō Station 多賀城駅
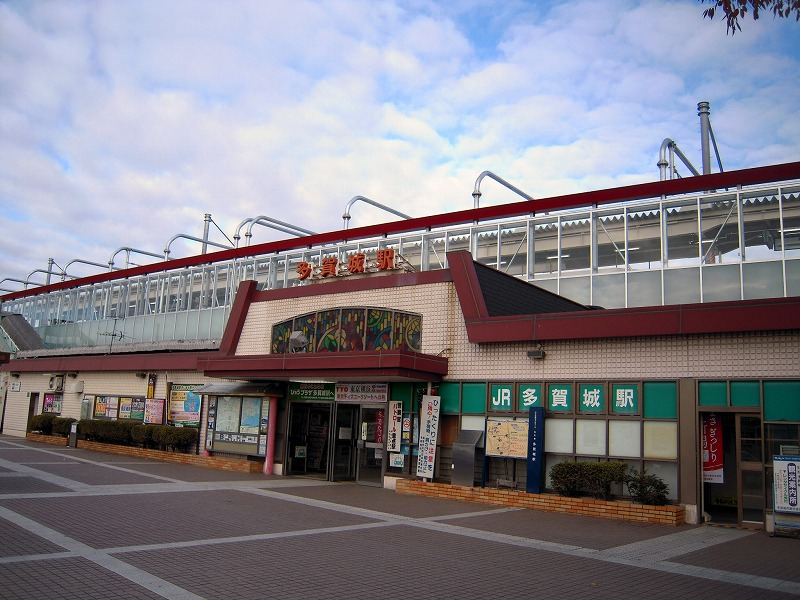
- Tagajō Station in November 2009

General information
- Location: 2-7-1 Chuo, Tagajō-shi, Miyagi-ken 985-0873; Japan
- Coordinates: 38.2919°N 141.0055°E
- Operator: JR East
- Line: ■ Senseki Line
- Distance: 12.6 km from Aoba-dōri
- Platforms: 1 side + 1 island platform
- Tracks: 3

Other information
- Status: Staffed (Midori no Madoguchi)
- Website: Official website

History
- Opened: June 5, 1925
- Rebuilt: 2013

Passengers
- FY2018: 7,201 daily

Services
Preceding station	JR East	Following station
Nakanosakae towards Aoba-dori	Senseki Line	Geba towards Ishinomaki
Location
- Location within Miyagi Prefecture Location within Japan

Tagajō Station (多賀城駅, Tagajō-eki) is a railway station in the city of Tagajō, Miyagi Prefecture, Japan, operated by East Japan Railway Company (JR East).

== Lines ==
Tagajō Station is served by the Senseki Line, and is located 12.6 kilometers from the terminus of the line at Aoba-dōri.

== Station layout ==
The station has one elevated side platform and one elevated island platform with the station building underneath. The station has a Midori no Madoguchi staffed ticket office.

=== Platforms ===
1-2	■ Senseki Line	for Sendai and Aoba-dōri
3	■ Senseki Line	for Matsushima-Kaigan and Takagimachi

== History ==
Tagajō Station opened on June 5, 1925, as a station on the Miyagi Electric Railway. The line was nationalized on May 1, 1944. The station was absorbed into the JR East network upon the privatization of JNR on April 1, 1987. A new station building was completed in November 2013.

== Passenger statistics ==
In fiscal 2018, the station was used by an average of 7,201 passengers daily (boarding passengers only).

== Surrounding area ==
- Tagajō City Hall
- Ruins of Tagajō Temple
- Tagajō Post Office
- National Route 45

== See also ==
- List of railway stations in Japan
