= Matsushima-Kaigan Station =

Railway station in Matsushima, Miyagi Prefecture, Japan

Matsushima-Kaigan Station 松島海岸駅
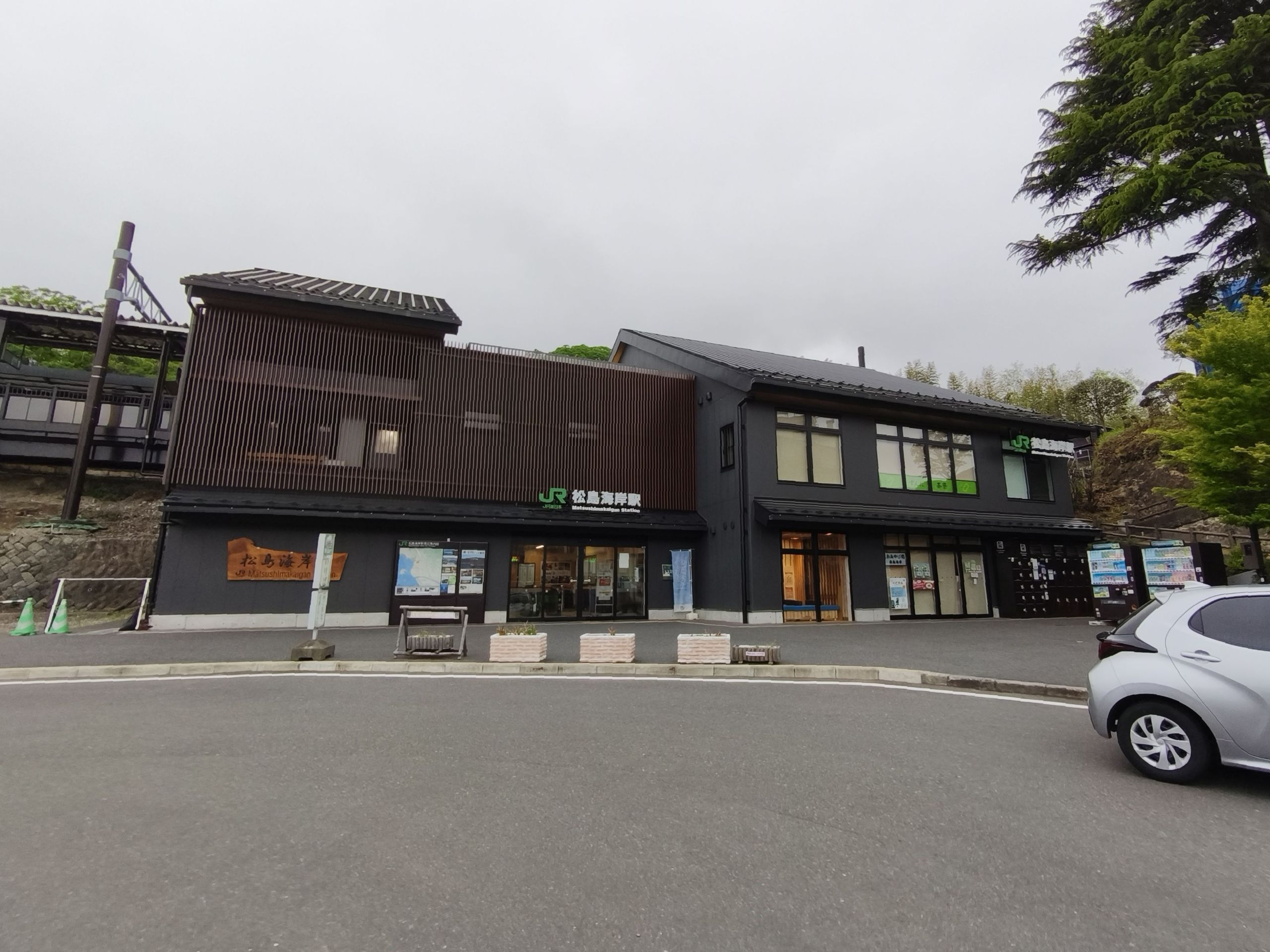
- Matsushima-Kaigan Station, June 2026

General information
- Location: Matsushima, Matsushima-cho, Miyagi-gun, Miyagi-ken 981-0213; Japan
- Coordinates: 38°22′5.31″N 141°3′31.64″E
- Distance: 23.2 km from Aoba-dōri
- Platforms: 1 island platform
- Tracks: 2

Other information
- Status: Staffed (Midori no Madoguchi )
- Website: Official website

History
- Opened: April 18, 1927
- Former names: Matsushima-Kōen (until 1944)

Passengers
- FY2018: 1054

Services
Preceding station	JR East	Following station
Rikuzen-Hamada towards Aoba-dori	Senseki Line	Takagimachi towards Ishinomaki
Location
- Location within Miyagi Prefecture Location within Japan

Matsushima-Kaigan Station (松島海岸駅, Matsushima-Kaigan-eki) is a railway station in the town of Matsushima, Miyagi Prefecture, Japan, operated by East Japan Railway Company (JR East).

== Lines ==
Matsushima-Kaigan Station is served by the Senseki Line. It is located 23.2 rail kilometers from the terminus of the Senseki Line at Aoba-dōri Station.

== Station layout ==
The station has one elevated island platform with the station building underneath. The station has a Midori no Madoguchi staffed ticket office.

=== Platforms ===
1	■ Senseki Line	for Sendai and Aoba-dōri
2	■ Senseki Line	for Yamoto and Ishinomaki

== History ==
Matsushima-Kaigan Station opened on April 18, 1927 as Matsushima Kōen Station (松島公園駅) on the Miyagi Electric Railway. The line was nationalized on May 1, 1944 and the station was renamed to its present name at that time. The station was absorbed into the JR East network upon the privatization of JNR on April 1, 1987. The station was closed from March 11 to May 28, 2011 due to damage associated with the 2011 Tōhoku earthquake and tsunami.

== Passenger statistics ==
In fiscal 2018, the station was used by an average of 1,164 passengers daily (boarding passengers only).

== Surrounding area ==
- Matsushima
- Zuigan-ji

== See also ==
- List of railway stations in Japan
