= Miyaginohara Station =

Railway station in Sendai, Japan

Miyaginohara Station 宮城野原駅
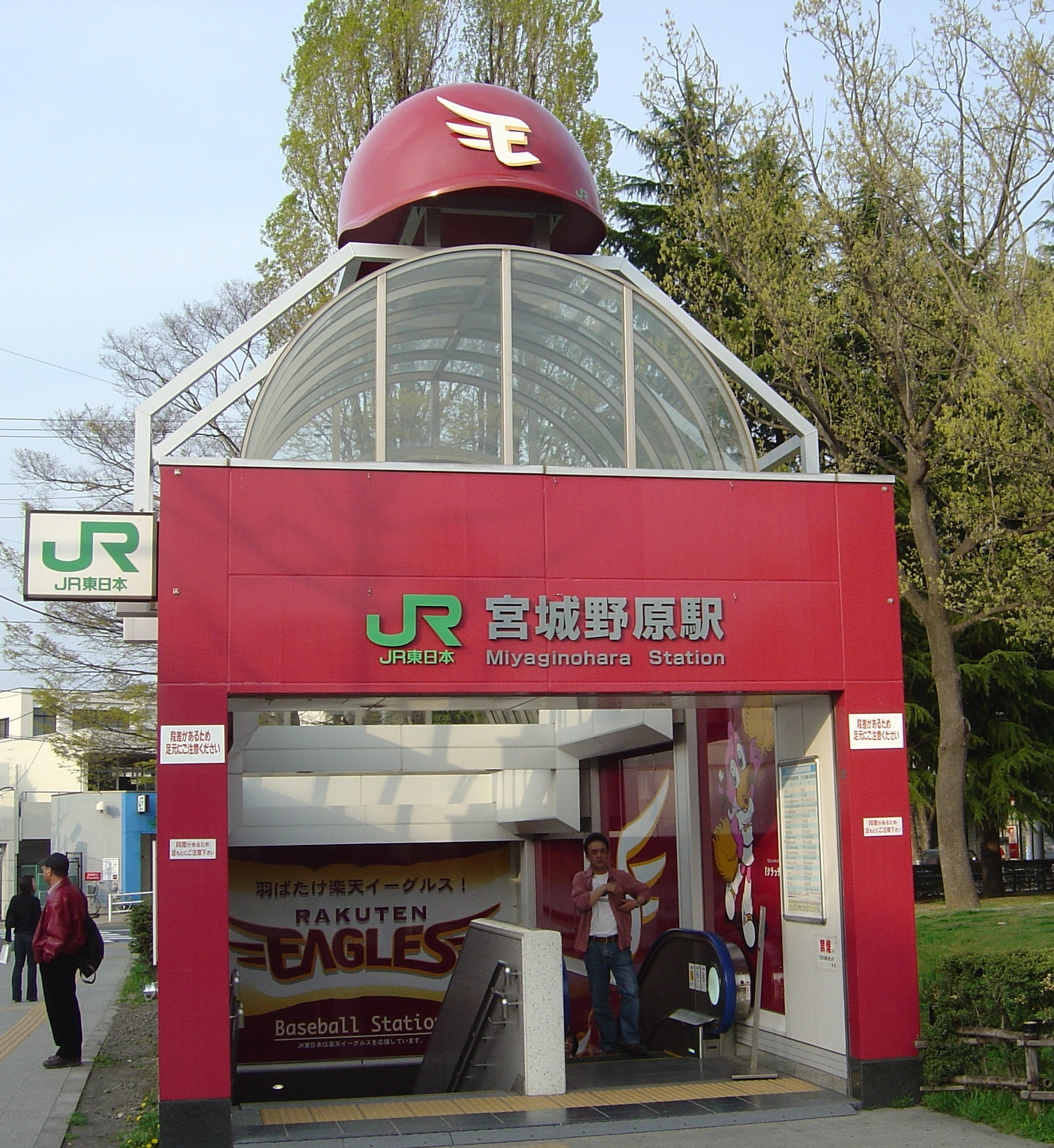
- Entrance to Miyaginohara Station, May 2006

General information
- Location: 2-4-1 Miyagino, Miyagino-ku, Sendai-shi, Miyagi-ken 983-0045; Japan
- Coordinates: 38.2611°N 140.9052°E
- Operator: JR East
- Line: ■ Senseki Line
- Distance: 2.4 km from Aoba-dōri
- Platforms: 1 island platform
- Tracks: 2

Other information
- Status: Staffed (Midori no Madoguchi)
- Website: Official website

History
- Opened: 1 January 1925
- Rebuilt: 2000

Passengers
- FY2018: 6,070 daily

Services
Preceding station	JR East	Following station
Tsutsujigaoka towards Aoba-dori	Senseki Line	Rikuzen-Haranomachi towards Ishinomaki
Location
- Location within Miyagi Prefecture Location within Japan

Miyaginohara Station (宮城野原駅, Miyaginohara-eki) is an underground railway station on the Senseki Line in Miyagino-ku in Sendai, Miyagi, Japan, operated by East Japan Railway Company (JR East).

== Lines ==
Miyaginohara Station is served by the Senseki Line. It is located 2.4 rail kilometers from the terminus of the Senseki Line at Aoba-dōri.

== Station layout ==
The station is an underground station with one island platform serving two tracks. The station has a Midori no Madoguchi staffed ticket office. As the station is the closest railway station to Rakuten Seimei Park Miyagi, home of the Tohoku Rakuten Golden Eagles, logos of the team, images of their players, as well as art of their mascots, Clutch and Clutchyna, are shown prominently in the station, as well as having the model of the team's cap on top of the entrance. Clutch is drawn in the platform for the 2nd platform, while Clutchyna is drawn on the 1st platform.

=== Platforms ===
1	■ Senseki Line	for Tagajō, Matsushima-Kaigan, and Takagimachi
2	■ Senseki Line	for Sendai and Aoba-dōri

== History ==
Miyaginohara Station opened on January 1, 1926, as a station on the Miyagi Electric Railway. The line was nationalized on May 1, 1944. The station was absorbed into the JR East network upon the privatization of JNR on April 1, 1987. The station was relocated underground in 2000, some 150 meters to the southeast of its former location. On March 26, 2010, the station added its own departure melody, which is a part of the theme song of the Tohoku Rakuten Golden Eagles.

== Passenger statistics ==
In fiscal 2018, the station was used by an average of 6,070 passengers daily (boarding passengers only).

== Surrounding area ==
- Miyagi Baseball Stadium
- Sendai City Athletic Stadium
- Sendai Ikuei Gakuen High School Miyaginohara Campus

== See also ==
- List of railway stations in Japan
