= Nobiru Station =

Railway station in Higashimatsushima, Miyagi Prefecture, Japan

Nobiru Station 野蒜駅
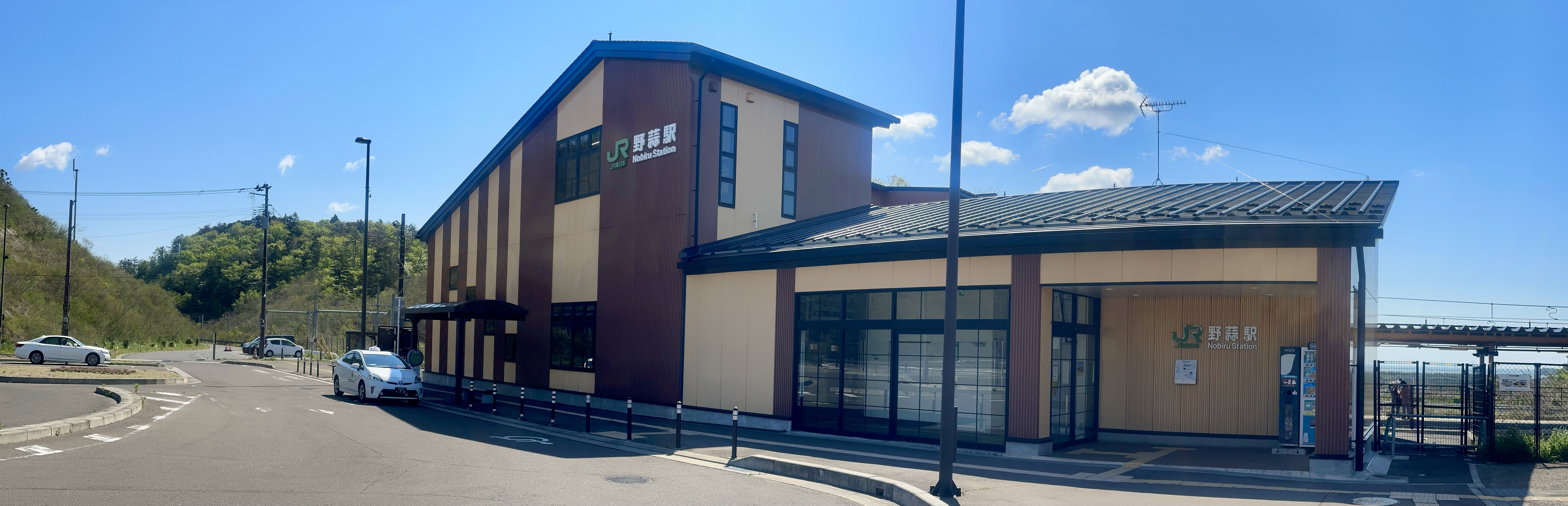
- Nobiru Station in May 2026

General information
- Location: Nobiru, Higashimatsushima-shi, Miyagi-ken 981-0411; Japan
- Coordinates: 38.3750°N 141.1603°E
- Operator: JR East
- Lines: ■ Senseki Line; ■ Senseki-Tōhoku Line
- Distance: 33.4 km from Aoba-dōri
- Platforms: 1 island platform
- Tracks: 2

Other information
- Status: Staffed
- Website: Official website

History
- Opened: April 10, 1928
- Rebuilt: 2015
- Former names: Tōhoku Suma (1931-1944)

Passengers
- FY2018: 197

Services
Preceding station	JR East	Following station
Takagimachi towards Sendai	Senseki-Tōhoku Line Rapid	Rikuzen-Ono towards Onagawa
Takagimachi towards Sendai	Senseki-Tōhoku Line Rapid	Rikuzen-Ono towards Ishinomaki
Tōna towards Aoba-dori	Senseki Line	Rikuzen-Ono towards Ishinomaki
Location
- Location within Miyagi Prefecture Location within Japan

Nobiru Station (野蒜駅, Nobiru-eki) is a railway station on the Senseki Line in the city of Higashimatsushima, Miyagi Prefecture, Japan, operated by the East Japan Railway Company (JR East).

== Lines ==
Nobiru Station is served by the Senseki Line, and is located 33.4 kilometers from the starting point of the Senseki Line at Aoba-dōri Station. It is also served by trains of the Senseki-Tōhoku Line.

== Station layout ==
The station has one island platform connected to the station building by a level crossing. The station is staffed.

=== Platforms ===
1	■ Senseki Line	for Yamoto and Ishinomaki
	■ Senseki-Tōhoku Line	for Yamato and Ishinomaki
2	■ Senseki Line	for Matsushima-Kaigan, Sendai, and Aoba-dōri
	■ Senseki-Tōhoku Line	for Shiogama and Sendai

== History ==
Nobiru Station opened on April 10, 1928 as a station on the Miyagi Electric Railway. On October 23, 1931, it was renamed Tōhoku Suma Station (東北須磨駅). The Miyagi Electric Railway was nationalized on May 1, 1944, and the station name reverted to its present name. The station was absorbed into the JR East network upon the privatization of JNR on April 1, 1987.

The station was closed from March 11, 2011, due to damage to the line associated with the 2011 Tōhoku earthquake and tsunami, and services were replaced by provisional bus services. The station reopened on May 30, 2015, on a higher ground where the former community around the station would be reconstructed. Due to the relocation, the distance from Aoba-Dōri was changed from 34.0 kilometers to 33.4 kilometers.

== Passenger statistics ==
In fiscal 2018, the station was used by an average of 197 passengers daily (boarding passengers only).

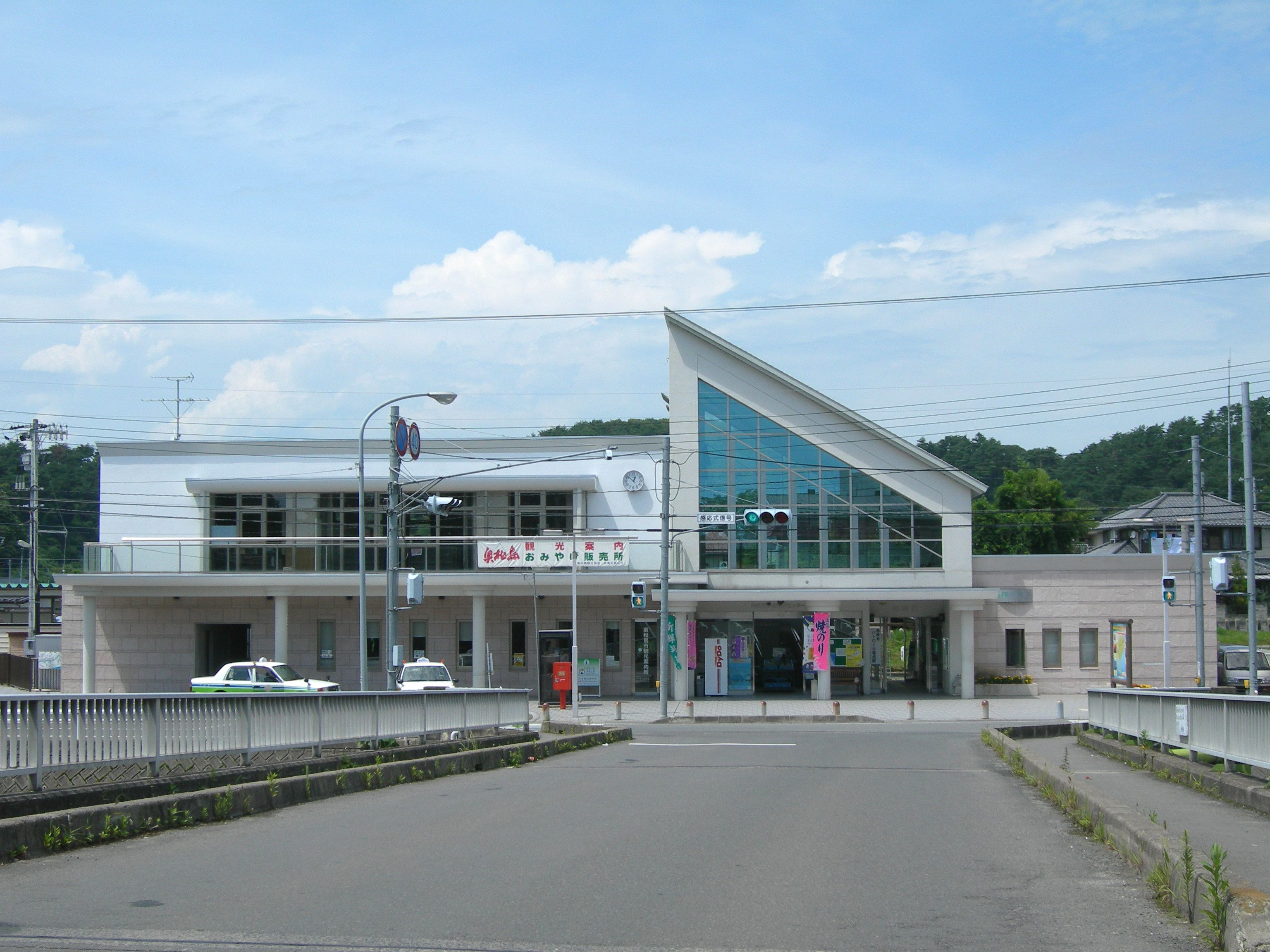
Nobiru Station in July 2009

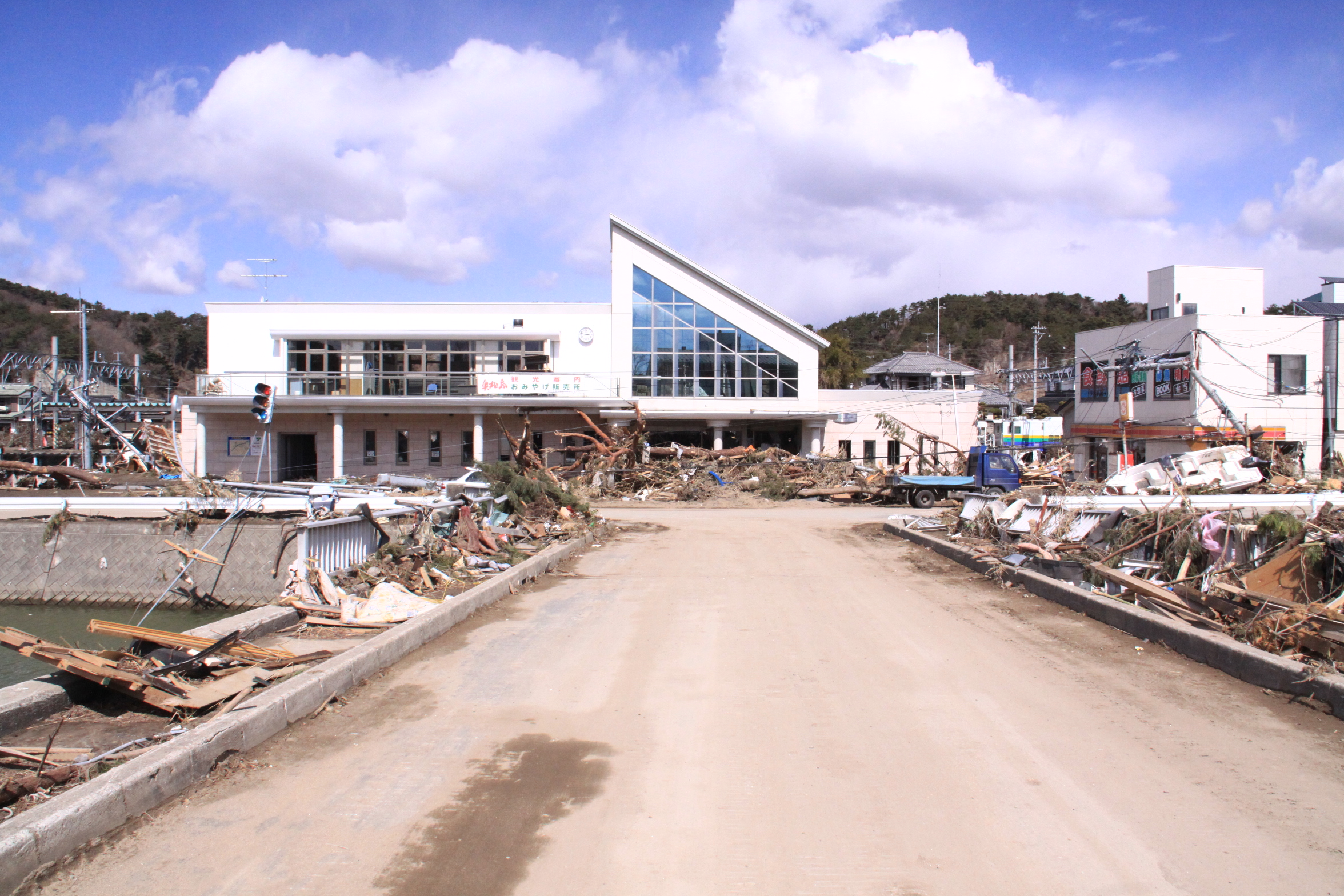
After the tsunami in 2011

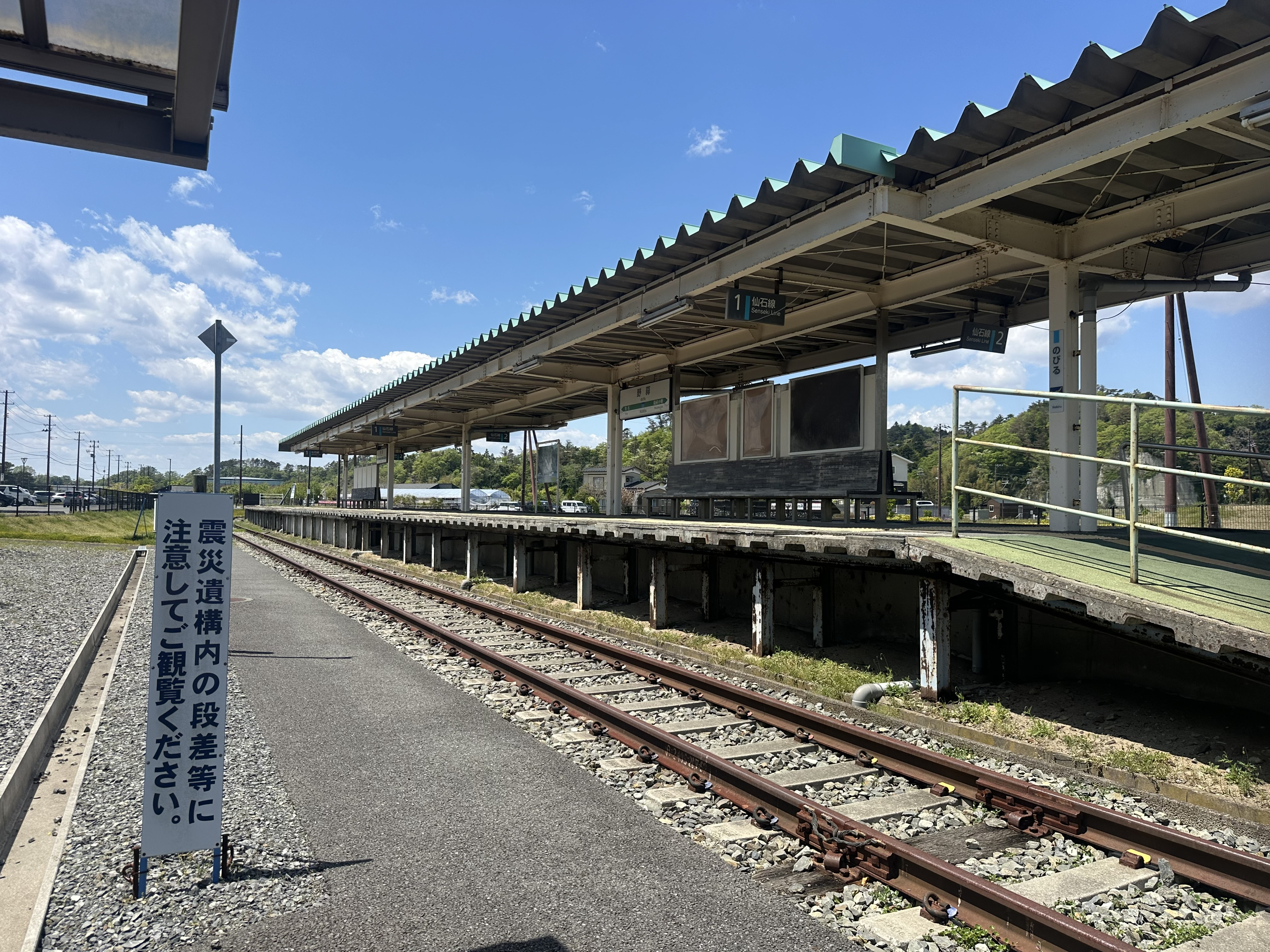
The abandoned platforms of the former station in May 2026

== Surrounding area ==
- Nobiru Post Office

== See also ==
- List of railway stations in Japan
