= Higashi-Yamoto Station =

Railway station in Higashimatsushima, Miyagi Prefecture, Japan

Higashi-Yamoto Station 東矢本駅
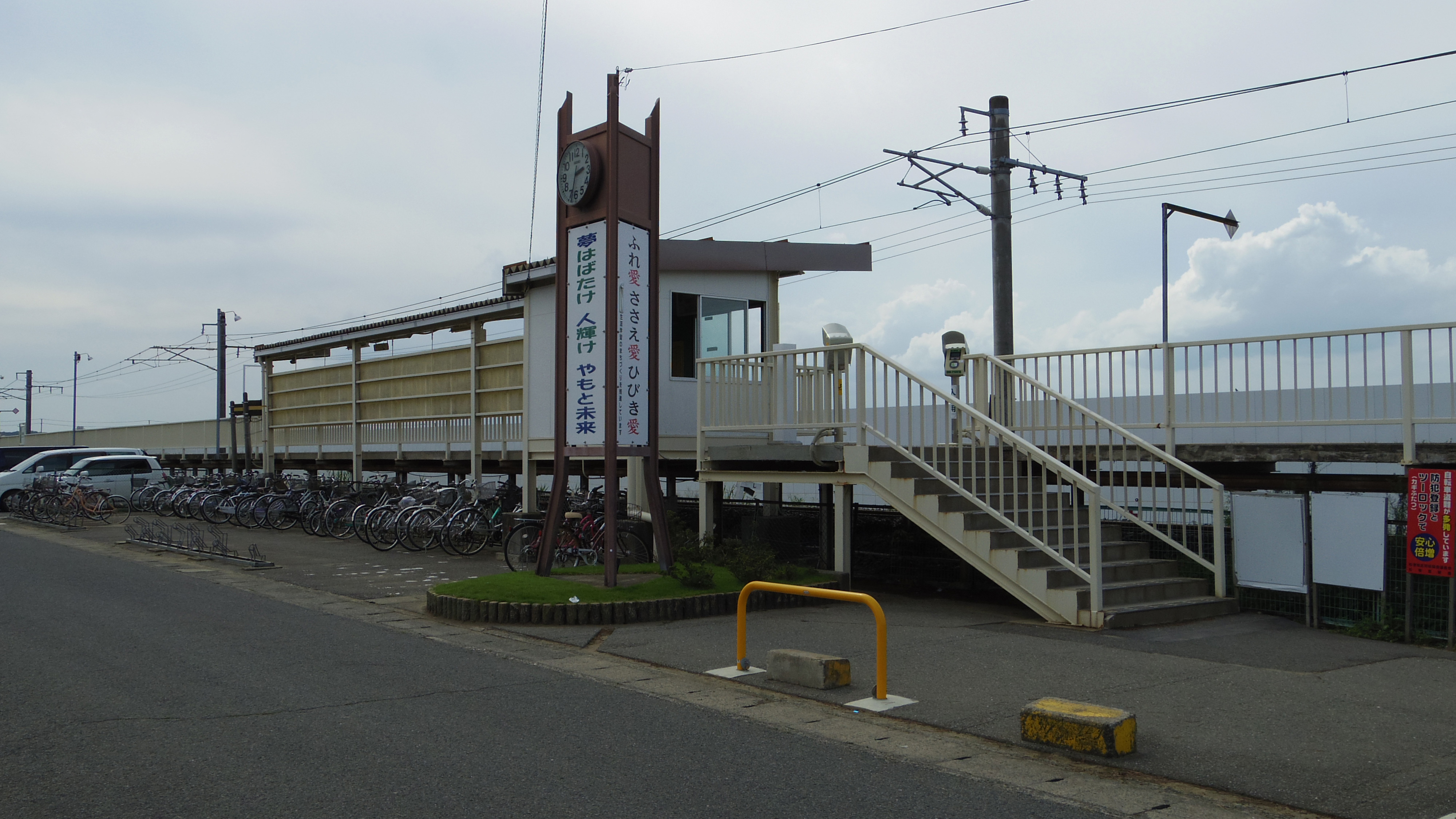
- Higashi-Yamoto Station, August 2014

General information
- Location: Yamoto Shimoura 184, Higashimatsushima-shi, Miyagi-ken 981-0506; Japan
- Coordinates: 38°25′41.08″N 141°13′21.28″E
- Operator: JR East
- Line: ■ Senseki Line
- Distance: 41.6 km from Aoba-dōri
- Platforms: 1 side platform
- Tracks: 1

Other information
- Status: Unstaffed
- Website: Official website

History
- Opened: March 31, 1987
- Rebuilt: 2015

Services
Preceding station	JR East	Following station
Yamoto towards Aoba-dori	Senseki Line	Rikuzen-Akai towards Ishinomaki
Location
- Location within Miyagi Prefecture Location within Japan

Higashi-Yamoto Station (東矢本駅, Higashi-Yamoto-eki) is a railway station in the city of Higashimatsushima, Miyagi Prefecture, Japan, operated by East Japan Railway Company (JR East).

== Lines ==
Higashi-Yamoto Station is served by the Senseki Line. It is located 41.6 rail kilometers from the terminus of the Senseki Line at Aoba-dōri Station.

== Station layout ==
The station has one side platform serving single bi-directional. The station is unattended.

== History ==
Higashi-Yamoto Station opened on March 31, 1987, the day before the JNR was privatized, becoming JR East.

The station was closed from March 11, 2011 due to damage to the line associated with the 2011 Tōhoku earthquake and tsunami, and services were replaced by provisional bus services. Services reopened on July 16, 2011 to Ishinomaki and on March 17, 2012 to Rikuzen-Ono; services past Rikuzen-Ono the direction of Sendai were resumed on May 30, 2015.

== Surrounding area ==
- National Route 45

== See also ==
- List of railway stations in Japan
