= Rikuzen-Ono Station =

Railway station in Higashimatsushima, Miyagi Prefecture, Japan

Rikuzen-Ono Station 陸前小野駅
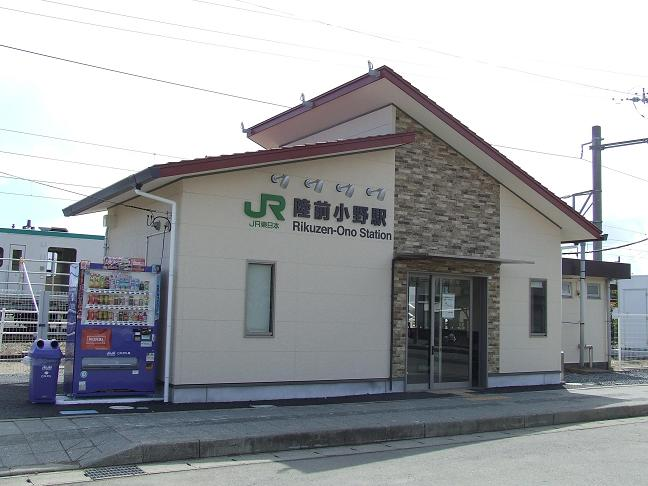
- Rikuzen-Ono Station, March 2012

General information
- Location: Ushiami Edohara 43, Higashimatsushima-shi, Miyagi-ken 981-0301; Japan
- Coordinates: 38.3962°N 141.1745°E
- Operator: JR East
- Lines: ■ Senseki Line; ■ Senseki-Tōhoku Line
- Distance: 36.0 km from Aoba-dōri
- Platforms: 1 island platform
- Tracks: 2

Other information
- Status: Unstaffed
- Website: Official website

History
- Opened: November 22, 1928
- Rebuilt: 2012

Passengers
- FY2018: 345

Services
Preceding station	JR East	Following station
Nobiru towards Sendai	Senseki-Tōhoku Line Rapid	Yamoto towards Onagawa
Nobiru towards Sendai	Senseki-Tōhoku Line Rapid	Yamoto towards Ishinomaki
Nobiru towards Aoba-dori	Senseki Line	Kazuma towards Ishinomaki
Location
- Location within Miyagi Prefecture Location within Japan

Rikuzen-Ono Station (陸前小野駅, Rikuzen-Ono-eki) is a railway station in the city of Higashimatsushima, Miyagi Prefecture, Japan, operated by East Japan Railway Company (JR East).

== Lines ==
Rikuzen-Ono Station is served by the Senseki Line. It is located 36.0 rail kilometers from the terminus of the Senseki Line at Aoba-dōri Station.

== Station layout ==
The station has one island platform serving two tracks, connected to the station building by a level crossing. The station is unattended.

=== Platforms ===
1	■ Senseki Line	for Yamoto and Ishinomaki
	■ Senseki-Tōhoku Line	for Yamato and Ishinomaki
2	■ Senseki Line	for Matsushima-Kaigan, Sendai, and Aoba-dōri
	■ Senseki-Tōhoku Line	for Shiogama and Sendai

== History ==
Rikuzen-Ono Station opened on April 10, 1928, as a station on the Miyagi Electric Railway. The Miyagi Electric Railway was nationalized on May 1, 1944. The station was absorbed into the JR East network upon the privatization of JNR on April 1, 1987.

The station was closed from March 11, 2011 due to damage to the line associated with the 2011 Tōhoku earthquake and tsunami, and services were replaced by provisional bus services. The station reopened on March 17, 2012, in the direction of Yamoto and Ishinomaki and a new station building was inaugurated on that date. Services in the direction of Sendai were resumed on May 30, 2015.

== Passenger statistics ==
In fiscal 2018, the station was used by an average of 345 passengers daily (boarding passengers only).

== Surrounding area ==
- National Route 45

== See also ==
- List of railway stations in Japan
