= Kazuma Station =

Railway station in Higashimatsushima, Miyagi Prefecture, Japan

Kazuma Station 鹿妻駅
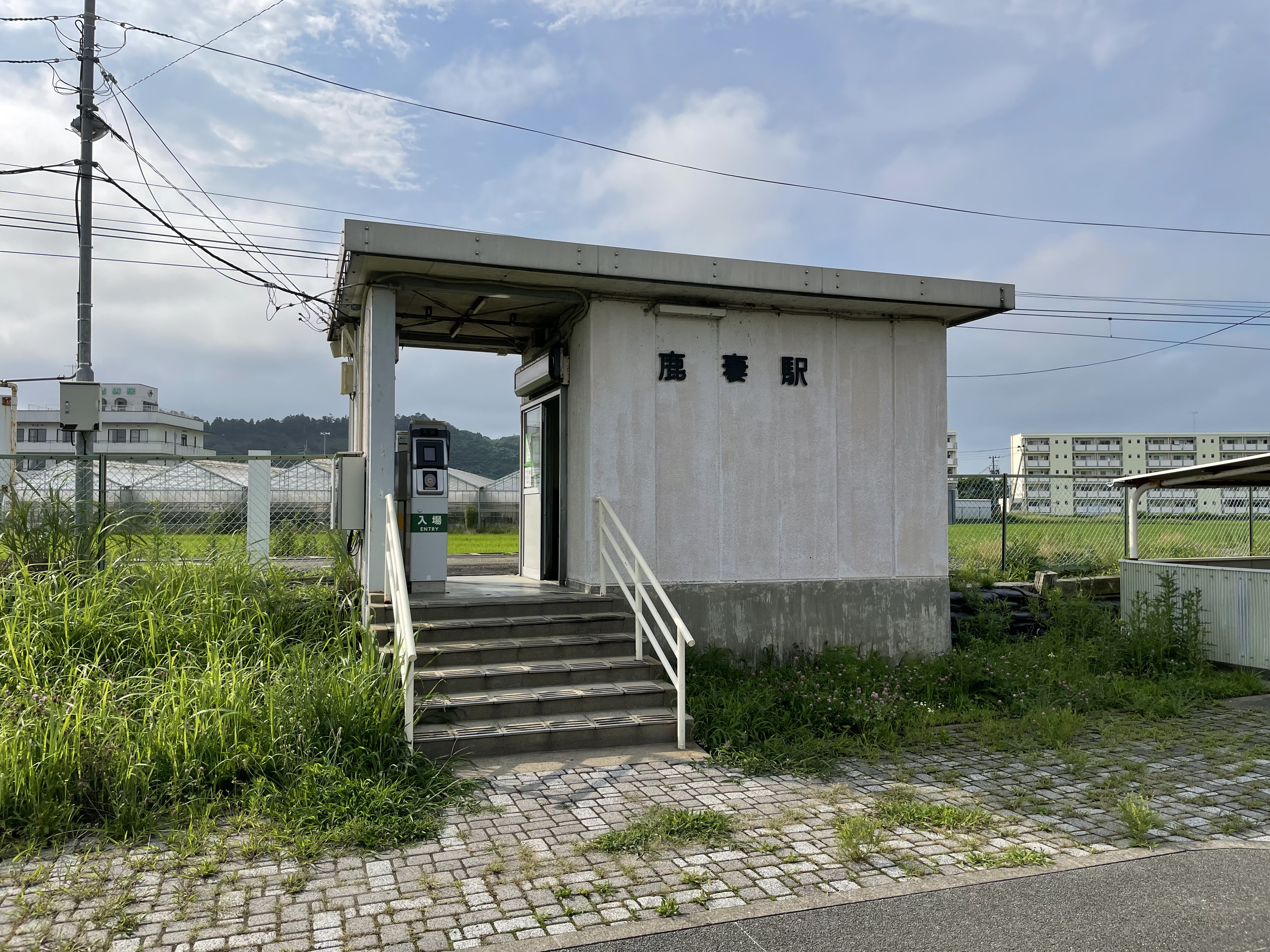
- Kazuma Station, July 2022

General information
- Location: Yamoto Anajiri, Higashimatsushima-shi, Miyagi-ken 981-0503; Japan
- Coordinates: 38.4033°N 141.1902°E
- Operator: JR East
- Line: ■ Senseki Line
- Distance: 43.1 km from Aoba-dōri
- Platforms: 1 side platform
- Tracks: 1

Other information
- Status: Unstaffed
- Website: Official website

History
- Opened: June 1, 1929

Services
Preceding station	JR East	Following station
Rikuzen-Ono towards Aoba-dori	Senseki Line	Yamoto towards Ishinomaki
Location
- Location within Miyagi Prefecture Location within Japan

Kazuma Station (鹿妻駅, Kazuma-eki) is a railway station in the city of Higashimatsushima, Miyagi Prefecture, Japan, operated by East Japan Railway Company (JR East).

== Lines ==
Kazuma Station is served by the Senseki Line. It is located 37.6 rail kilometers from the terminus of the Senseki Line at Aoba-dōri Station.

== Station layout ==
The station has one side platform serving a single bi-directional track. The station is unattended.

== History ==
Kazuma Station opened on June 1, 1929 as a station on the Miyagi Electric Railway. The Miyagi Electric Railway was nationalized on May 1, 1944. Operations were suspended for a one-year period between June 10, 1945 and June 10, 1946. The station was absorbed into the JR East network upon the privatization of JNR on April 1, 1987.

The station was closed from March 11, 2011 due to damage to the line associated with the 2011 Tōhoku earthquake and tsunami, and services were replaced by provisional bus services. Services reopened on March 17, 2012 between Rikuzen-Ono and Ishinomaki; services past Rikuzen-Ono the direction of Sendai was resumed on May 30, 2015.

== Surrounding area ==
- National Route 45
- Makabe Hospital

== See also ==
- List of railway stations in Japan
