= Senseki-Tōhoku Line =

Railway line in Japan

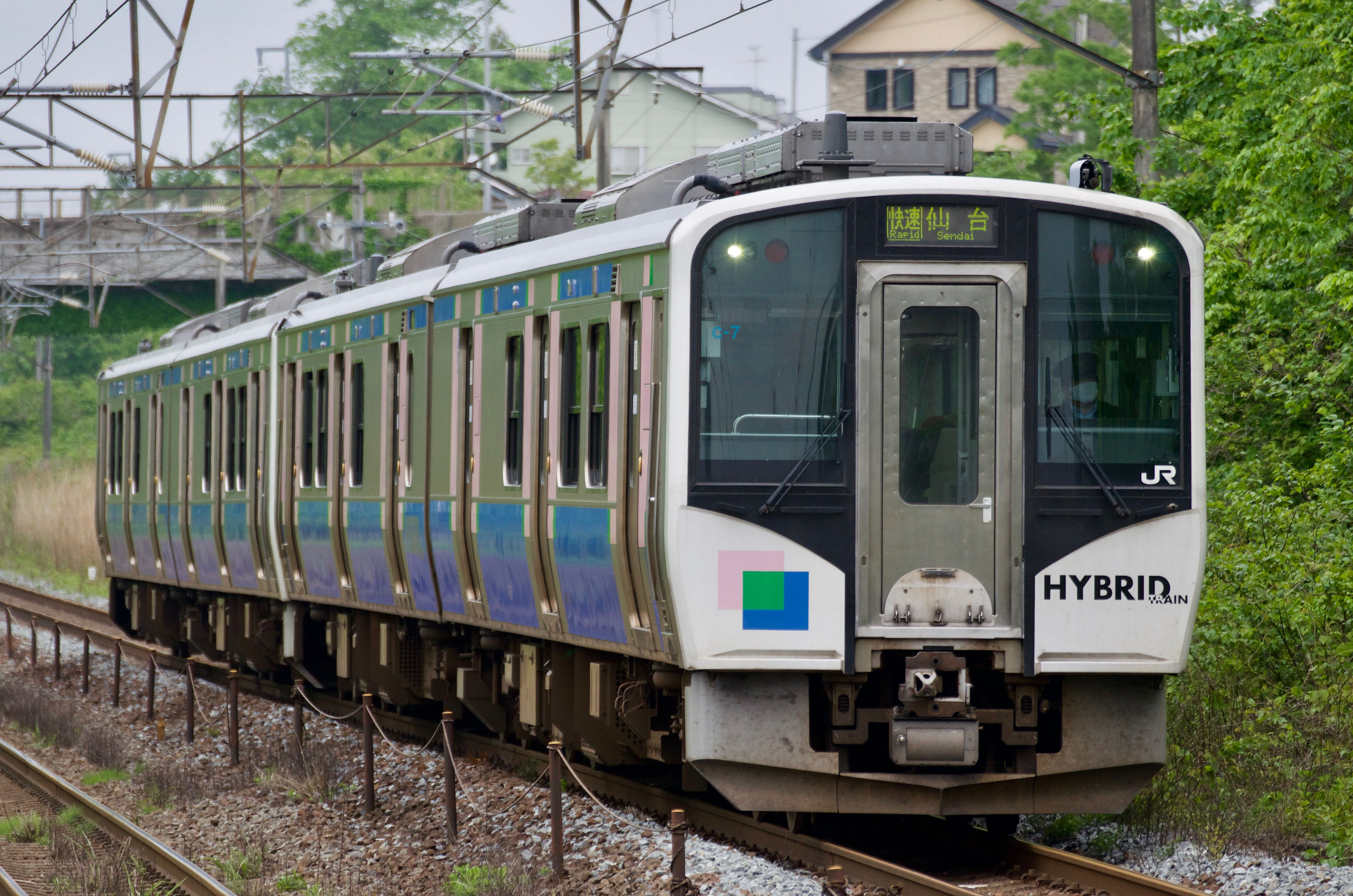
- A Senseki-Tōhoku Line HB-E210 series hybrid DMU train

Overview
- Native name: 仙石東北ライン
- Owner: JR East
- Locale: Miyagi Prefecture
- Termini: Sendai; Onagawa
- Stations: 22

Service
- Type: Commuter rail
- System: JR East
- Rolling stock: HB-E210 series hybrid DMUs

History
- Opened: 30 May 2015; 11 years ago

Technical
- Line length: 64.0 km (39.8 mi)
- Track gauge: 1,067 mm (3 ft 6 in)

The Senseki-Tōhoku Line (仙石東北ライン, Senseki-Tōhoku Rain) is a 64.0 km (39.77 mi) railway line in Miyagi Prefecture, Japan, opened by the East Japan Railway Company (JR East) on 30 May 2015. It connects Sendai Station in Sendai with Ishinomaki Station in Ishinomaki, using existing Tōhoku Main Line tracks between Sendai and Shiogama and Senseki Line tracks between Takagimachi and Ishinomaki, linked by a new 0.3 km (0.19 mi) connection between Shiogama and Takagimachi stations. One return service a day goes to and from Onagawa.

== Service outline ==
In addition to all-stations "Local" services, semi-fast "Rapid" services and one limited-stop "Special Rapid" service operate on the line between Sendai and Ishinomaki.

== Stations ==
● - all trains stop
◇ - some trains stop
△ - Sendai bound trains only stop
| - trains do not stop

Line	Station	Distance in km (mi)	Rapid		Special Rapid	Transfers	Location
Line	Station	Distance in km (mi)	Green	Red	Special Rapid	Transfers	Location
Tōhoku	Sendai 仙台	0 (0)	●	●	●	Tōhoku Shinkansen; Akita Shinkansen; ■ Senzan Line; ■ Senseki Line; ■ Jōban Line; ■ Sendai Subway Namboku Line (N10); ■ Sendai Subway Tōzai Line (T07); Sendai Airport Line	Aoba-ku, Sendai
Tōhoku	Higashi-Sendai 東仙台	4.0 (2.5)	●	|	|		Miyagino-ku, Sendai
Tōhoku	Iwakiri 岩切	8.1 (5.0)	●	|	|		Miyagino-ku, Sendai
Tōhoku	Rikuzen-Sannō 陸前山王	10.4 (6.5)	●	|	|		Tagajo
Tōhoku	Kokufu-Tagajō 国府多賀城	11.7 (7.3)	●	|	|		Tagajo
Tōhoku	Shiogama 塩釜	13.4 (8.3)	●	●	●		Shiogama
Senseki	Takagimachi 高城町	23.7 (14.7)	●	●	●		Matsushima
Senseki	Nobiru 野蒜	31.6 (19.6)	●	●	|		Higashimatsushima
Senseki	Rikuzen-Ono 陸前小野	34.2 (21.3)	●	●	|		Higashimatsushima
Senseki	Yamoto 矢本	38.4 (23.9)	●	●	●		Higashimatsushima
Senseki	Rikuzen-Akai 陸前赤井	41.3 (25.7)	●	●	|		Higashimatsushima
Senseki	Ishinomakiayumino 石巻あゆみ野	43.4 (27.0)	△	◇	|		Ishinomaki
Senseki	Hebita 蛇田	44.8 (27.8)	●	●	|		Ishinomaki
Senseki	Rikuzen-Yamashita 陸前山下	45.8 (28.5)	●	●	|		Ishinomaki
Ishinomaki	Ishinomaki 石巻	47.2 (29.3)	●	●	●	■ Ishinomaki Line	Ishinomaki
Ishinomaki	Rikuzen-Inai 陸前稲井	50.2 (31.2)		◇			Ishinomaki
Ishinomaki	Watanoha 渡波	55.2 (34.3)		◇			Ishinomaki
Ishinomaki	Mangokuura 万石浦	56.3 (35.0)		◇			Ishinomaki
Ishinomaki	Sawada 沢田	57.6 (35.8)		◇			Ishinomaki
Ishinomaki	Urashuku 浦宿	61.7 (38.3)		◇			Onagawa
Ishinomaki	Onagawa 女川	64.0 (39.8)		◇			Onagawa

== Rolling stock ==
Senseki-Tohoku Line services use a fleet of new HB-E210 series 2-car hybrid diesel multiple unit (DMU) trains, mostly operated as four-car formations.

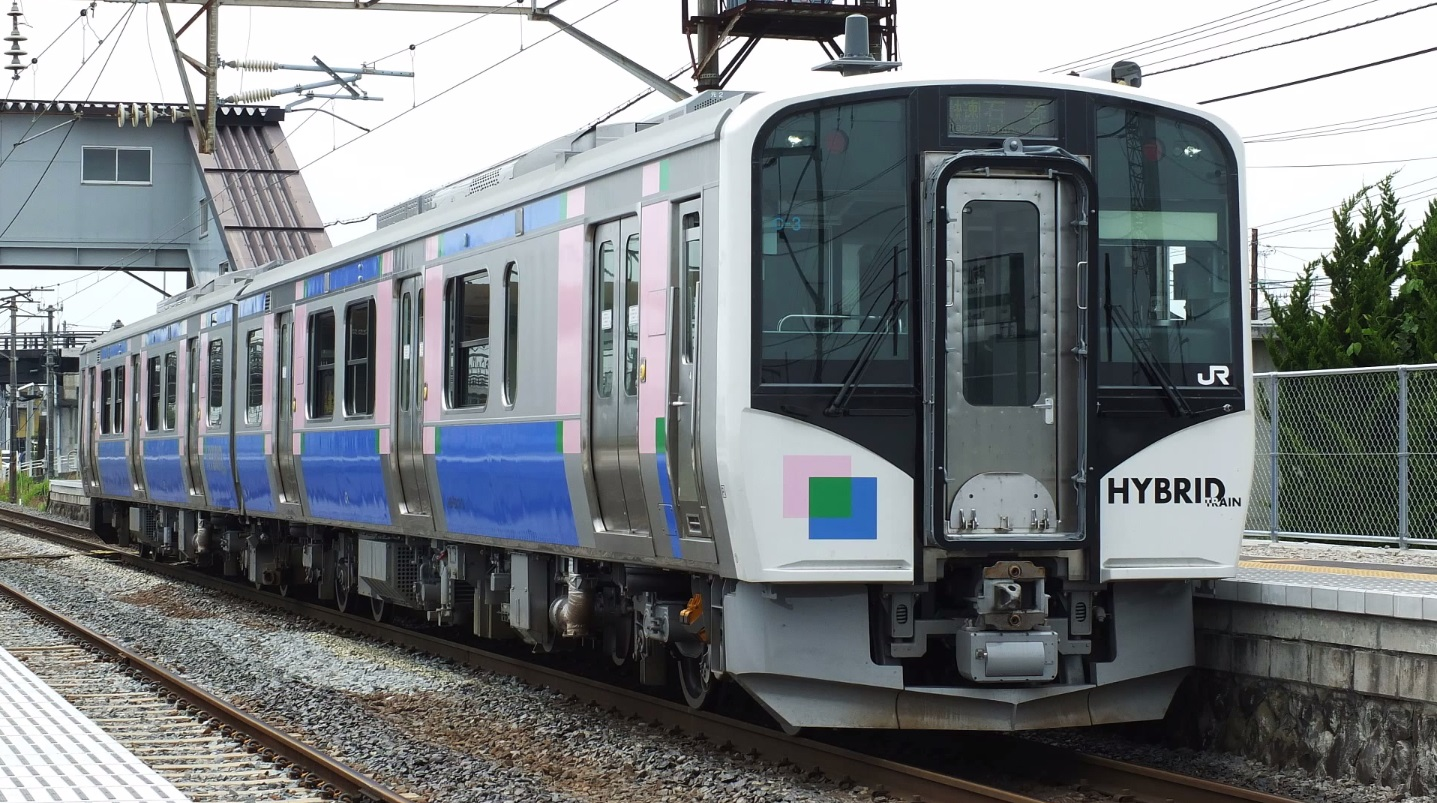
An HB-E210 series hybrid DMU

== History ==
Government approval to build the new 0.3 km (0.19 mi) connecting line between the existing Tohoku Main Line and Senseki Line was granted in March 2013. In July 2013, JR East announced its plans to build a fleet of new two-car HB-E210 series hybrid DMUs to be used on through services between Sendai and Ishinomaki via the new line. The Senseki-Tohoku Line name for the new through services was formally announced in July 2014. The official opening date of 30 May 2015 was announced by JR East in January 2015. The opening of the Senseki-Tōhoku Line and the resumption of the entire Senseki Line were celebrated in the ceremony held at Nobiru Station on 30 May 2015 with Yoshihiro Murai, the Governor of Miyagi Prefecture.
