= Tsutsujigaoka Station (Miyagi) =

Railway station in Sendai, Japan

Tsutsujigaoka Station 榴ヶ岡駅
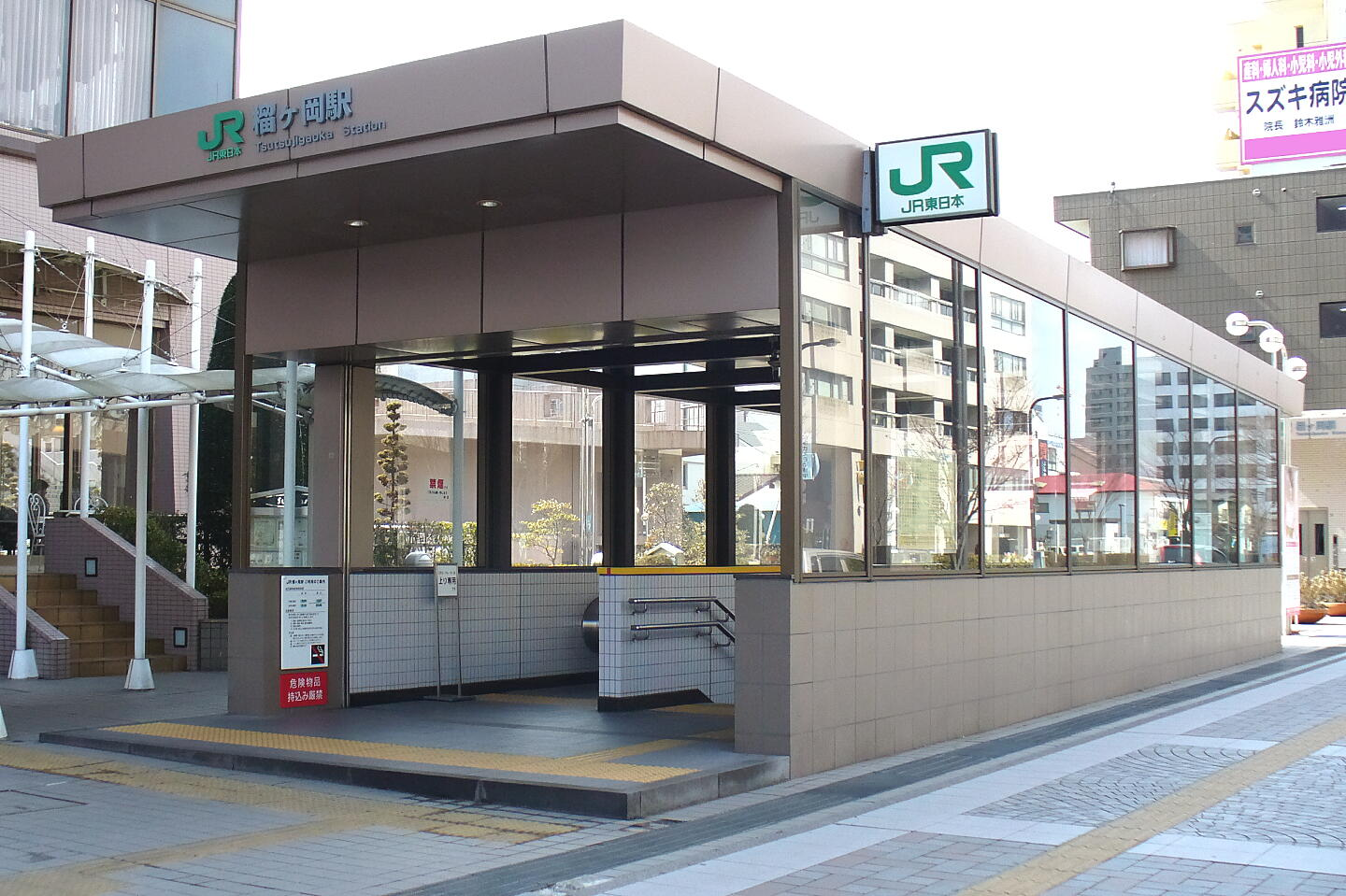
- The station entrance in March 2008

General information
- Location: 5-11-1 Tsutsujigaoka, Miyagino-ku, Sendai-shi, Miyagi-ken 83-0852; Japan
- Coordinates: 38.2587°N 140.8940°E
- Operator: JR East
- Line: ■ Senseki Line
- Distance: 1.3 km from Aoba-dōri
- Platforms: 1 island platform
- Tracks: 2

Other information
- Status: Staffed
- Website: Official website

History
- Opened: 5 June 1925
- Rebuilt: 1991

Passengers
- FY2018: 3,295 daily

Services
Preceding station	JR East	Following station
Sendai towards Aoba-dori	Senseki Line	Miyaginohara towards Ishinomaki
Location
- Location within Miyagi Prefecture Location within Japan

Tsutsujigaoka Station (榴ヶ岡駅, Tsutsujigaoka-eki) is an underground railway station in Miyagino-ku in Sendai, Miyagi Prefecture, Japan, operated by the East Japan Railway Company (JR East).

== Lines ==
Tsutsujigaoka Station is served by the Senseki Line and is located 1.3 kilometers from the terminus of the Senseki Line at Aoba-dōri.

== Station layout ==
The station is an underground station with one island platform serving two tracks.

=== Platforms ===
1	■ Senseki Line	for Tagajō, Matsushima-Kaigan, and Takagimachi
2	■ Senseki Line	for Sendai and Aoba-dōri

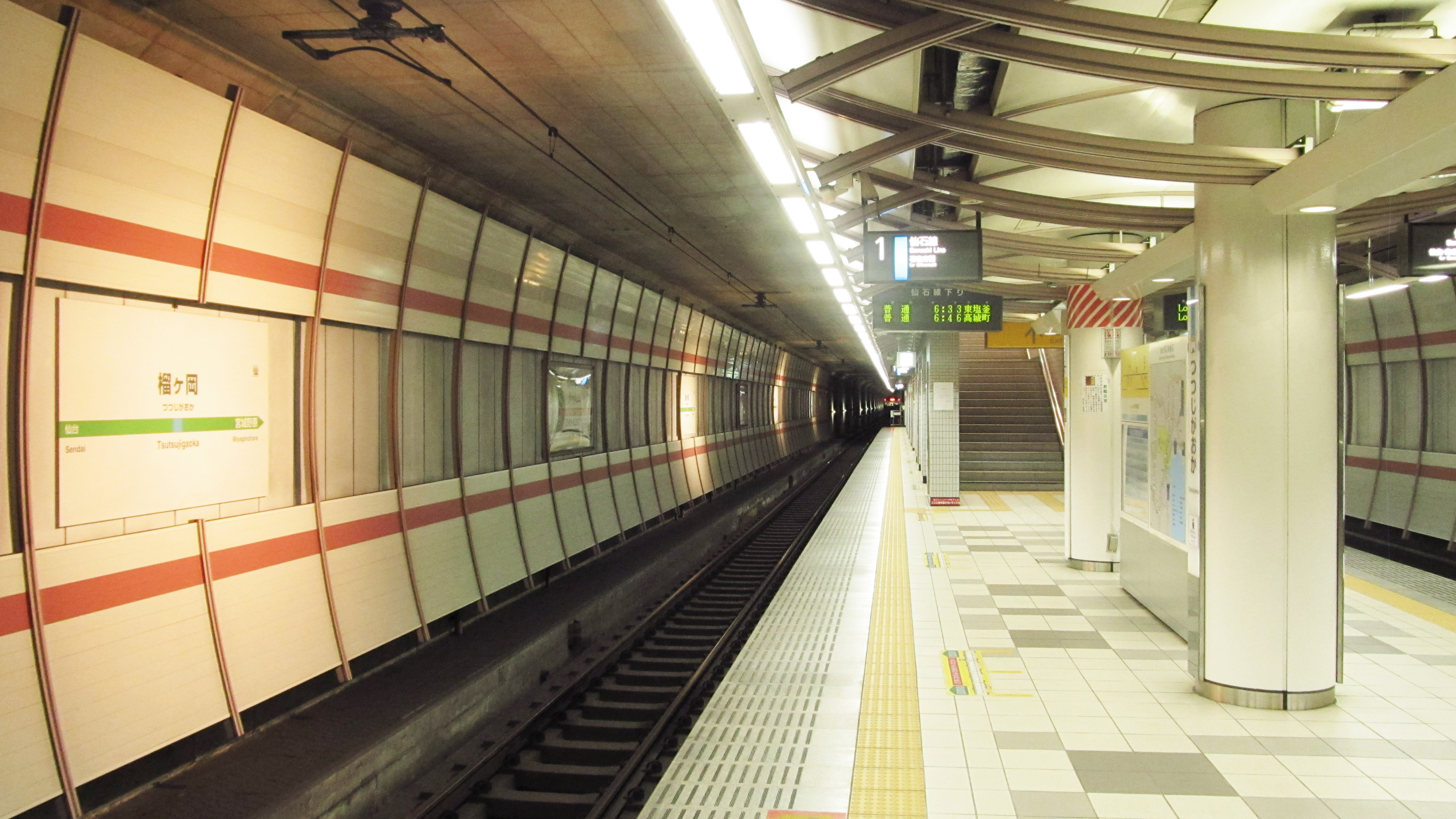
The platforms in August 2014

== History ==
Tsutsujigaoka Station opened on 5 June 1925, as a station on the Miyagi Electric Railway. The line was nationalized on May 1, 1944. The station was absorbed into the JR East network upon the privatization of JNR on April 1, 1987. The station was relocated underground in 1991.

== Passenger statistics ==
In fiscal 2018, the station was used by an average of 3,295 passengers daily (boarding passengers only).

== Surrounding area ==
- Tsutsujigaoka Park
- Tsutsujigaoka Post Office

== See also ==
- List of railway stations in Japan
