= Takagimachi Station =

Railway station in Matsushima, Miyagi Prefecture, Japan

Takagimachi Station 高城町駅
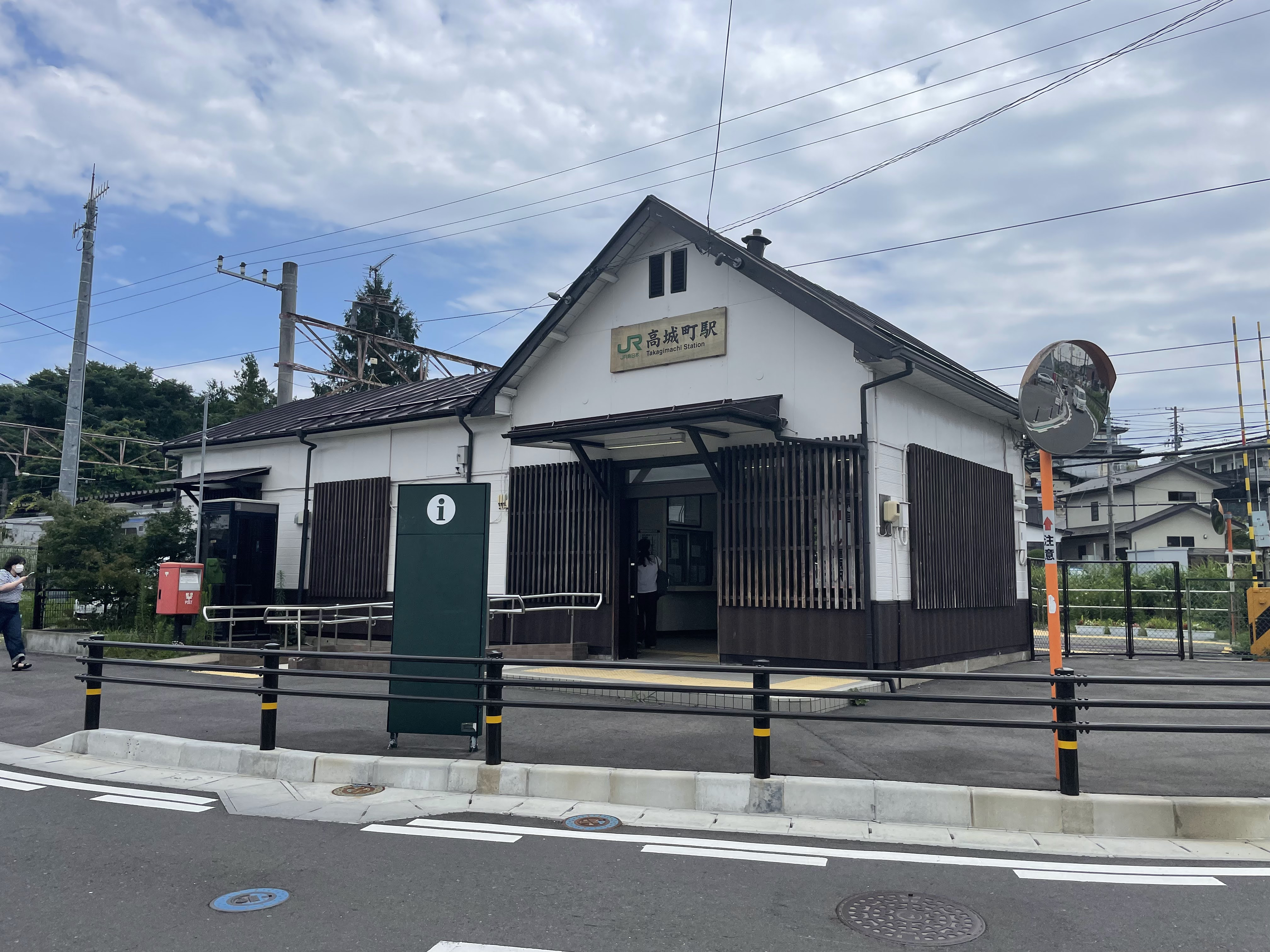
- Takagimachi Station in July, 2022

General information
- Location: Takagi Motokamaie, Matsushima-cho, Miyagi-gun, Miyagi-ken 981-0215; Japan
- Coordinates: 38.3829°N 141.0733°E
- Operator: JR East
- Lines: ■ Senseki Line; ■ Senseki-Tōhoku Line
- Distance: 25.5 km from Aoba-dōri
- Platforms: 1 island platform
- Tracks: 2

Other information
- Status: Staffed
- Website: Official website

History
- Opened: April 10, 1928
- Rebuilt: 2015

Passengers
- FY2018: 1,433 daily

Services
Preceding station	JR East	Following station
Shiogama towards Sendai	Senseki-Tōhoku Line Special Rapid	Yamoto towards Ishinomaki
Shiogama towards Sendai	Senseki-Tōhoku Line Rapid	Nobiru towards Onagawa
Shiogama towards Sendai	Senseki-Tōhoku Line Rapid	Nobiru towards Ishinomaki
Matsushima-Kaigan towards Aoba-dori	Senseki Line	Tetaru towards Ishinomaki
Location
- Location within Miyagi Prefecture Location within Japan

Takagimachi Station (高城町駅, Takagimachi-eki) is a railway station in the town of Matsushima, Miyagi, Japan, operated by East Japan Railway Company (JR East).

== Lines ==
Takagimachi Station is served by the Senseki Line, and lies 25.5 km from the terminus of the Senseki Line at Aoba-dōri Station. It is also served by trains of the Senseki-Tōhoku Line.

== Station layout ==
The station has one island platform serving two tracks and connected to the station building by a level crossing. The station is staffed.

=== Platforms ===
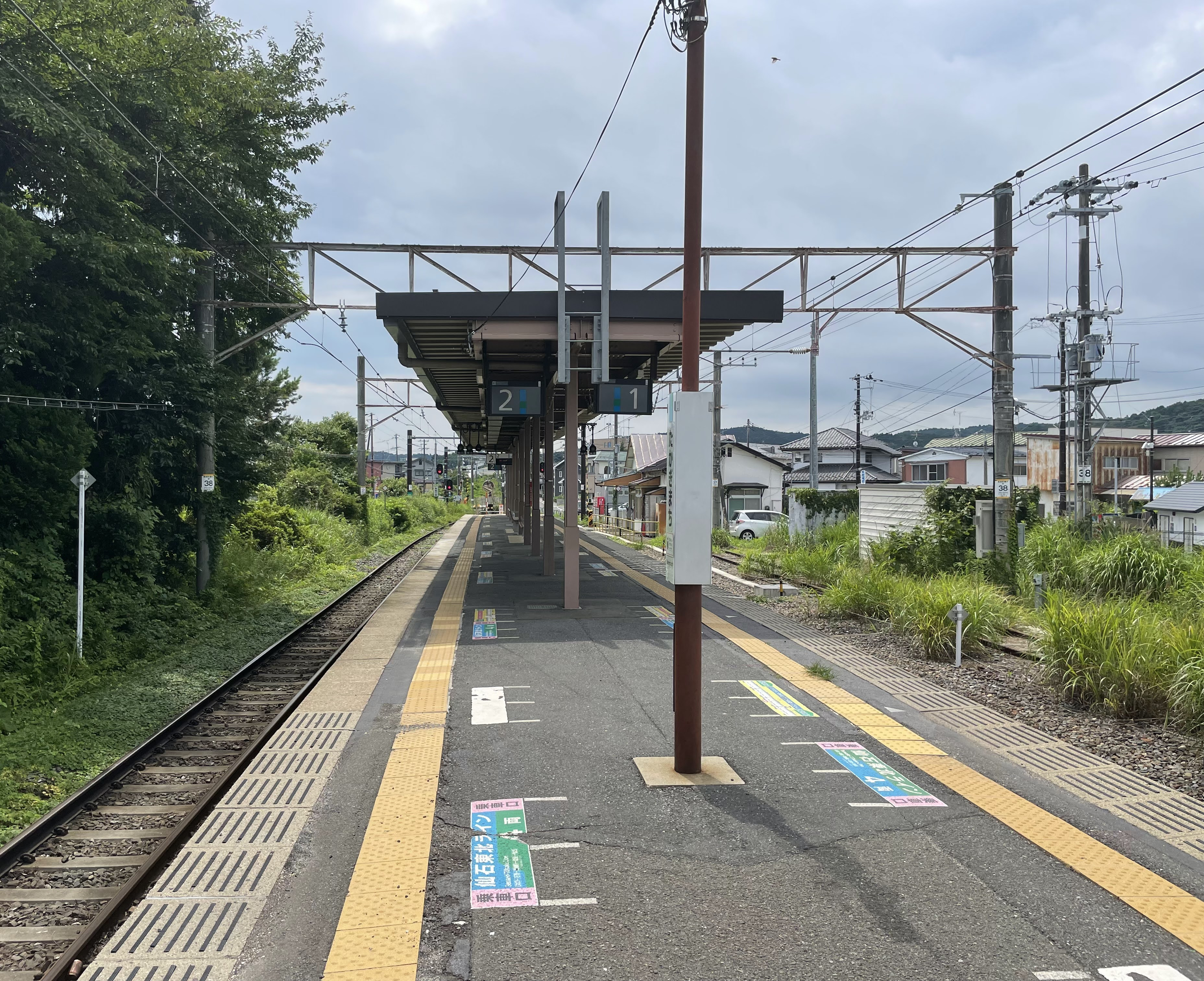
Platform (July, 2022)

1	■ Senseki Line	for Yamoto and Ishinomaki
	■ Senseki-Tōhoku Line	for Yamato and Ishinomaki
2	■ Senseki Line	for Matsushima-Kaigan Sendai and Aoba-dōri
	■ Senseki-Tōhoku Line	for Shiogama and Sendai

== History ==
Takagimachi Station opened on April 10, 1928, as a station on the Miyagi Electric Railway. The line was nationalized on May 1, 1944. The station was absorbed into the JR East network upon the privatization of JNR on April 1, 1987. The station was closed from March 11 to May 28, 2011 due to damage associated with the 2011 Tōhoku earthquake and tsunami, and services beyond Takagimachi Station in the direction of Ishinomaki Station were suspended and replaced by a provisional bus rapid transit service. The station was reopened on 30 May 2015.

== Passenger statistics ==
In fiscal 2018, the station was used by an average of 1,433 passengers daily (boarding passengers only).

== Surrounding area ==
- Matsushima Town Hall
- Matsushima Post Office

== See also ==
- List of railway stations in Japan
