= Satohama shell mound =

Archaeological site in Japan

Satohama Shell Midden
- 里浜貝塚 (Japanese)
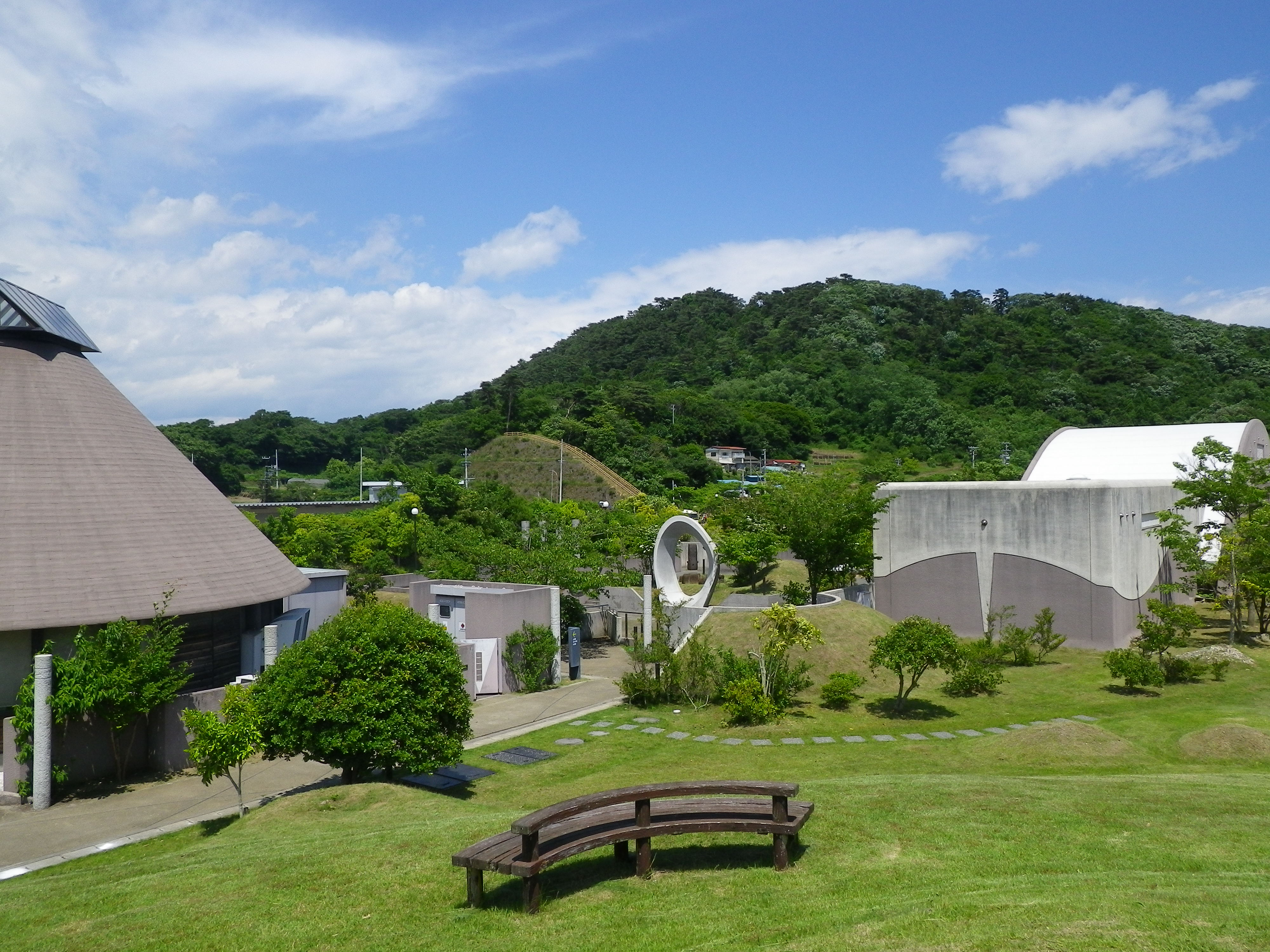
- The Historical Museum of Jomon Village Oku-Matsushima

- Satohama Shell Midden Satohama shell mound (Japan)
- 38.337731°N 141.147483°E
- Type: shell midden
- Periods: Jōmon period
- Location: Higashimatsushima, Miyagi, Japan
- Region: Tōhoku region

Site notes
- Elevation: 20–40 m (66–131 ft)
- Length: 800 m (2,600 ft)
- Width: 200 m (660 ft)
- Public access: Yes

The Satohama Shell Midden (里浜貝塚) is an archaeological site consisting of a shell midden and the remains of an adjacent Jōmon period settlement located in what is now the city of Higashimatsushima, Miyagi Prefecture in the Tōhoku region of northern Japan. It has been protected by the central government as a National Historic Site in 1995.

== Overview ==
During the early to middle Jōmon period (approximately 4000 to 2500 BC), sea levels were five to six meters higher than at present, and the ambient temperature was also 2 deg C higher. During this period, the Tōhoku region was inhabited by the Jōmon people, many of whom lived in coastal settlements. The middens associated with such settlements contain bone, botanical material, mollusc shells, sherds, lithics, and other artifacts and ecofacts associated with the now-vanished inhabitants, and these features, provide a useful source into the diets and habits of Jōmon society.

Most of these middens are found along the Pacific coast of Japan, and the rocky ria coast of Miyagi Prefecture was densely settled from the early through late Jōmon period. Some 59 shell middens have been found around Matsushima Bay alone, of which the Satohama site is one of the largest.

Located on Miyatojima, the largest island in Matsushima Bay, the midden is on a hill extending from east to west, extending 200 meters north-south and 800 meters east-west. It was first excavated by Tohoku Imperial University from 1918-1919. It is especially famous as the first case of stratigraphic excavation in Japan, with clear indication of small settlements in the early Jōmon period, larger settlements and shell mounds were left in each intermediate portion of the Jōmon period until the beginning of the Yayoi period, and small settlements continuing until at least the Heian period. The midden was more than six meters thick in places, and a wide variety of relics have been excavated. The many thousands of years of continuous occupation and clear stratification of the midden enabled researchers to develop a pottery chronology which had a great influence on the later Jōmon research.

In addition to vast numbers of shells, the mound included chestnuts, acorns, the bones of large oceanic fish, and the bones of deer, wild boar and numerous species of birds. More than sixty examples of human remains were also found. In addition, there are many examples of fishing gear and ornaments, some made from conch and other materials not native to the area, presuming some form of long distance trade, as well as polished stone axes. In total were 293 manufactured items of bone, 91 of shell, 168 of stone, and 38 of earthenware found during excavations which were designated an Important Cultural Property in 2000. Finds from the site are exhibited at the Historical Museum of Jomon Village OkuMatsushima.

Adjacent to the archeological site is the Okumatsushima Jōmon Village, where most of the excavated items can be seen in the historical museum located inside. It is located about 15 minutes by car from Nobiru Station on the JR East Senseki Line.

== See also ==
- List of Historic Sites of Japan (Miyagi)
