= Yamoto Station =

Railway station in Miyagi Prefecture, Japan

Yamoto Station 矢本駅
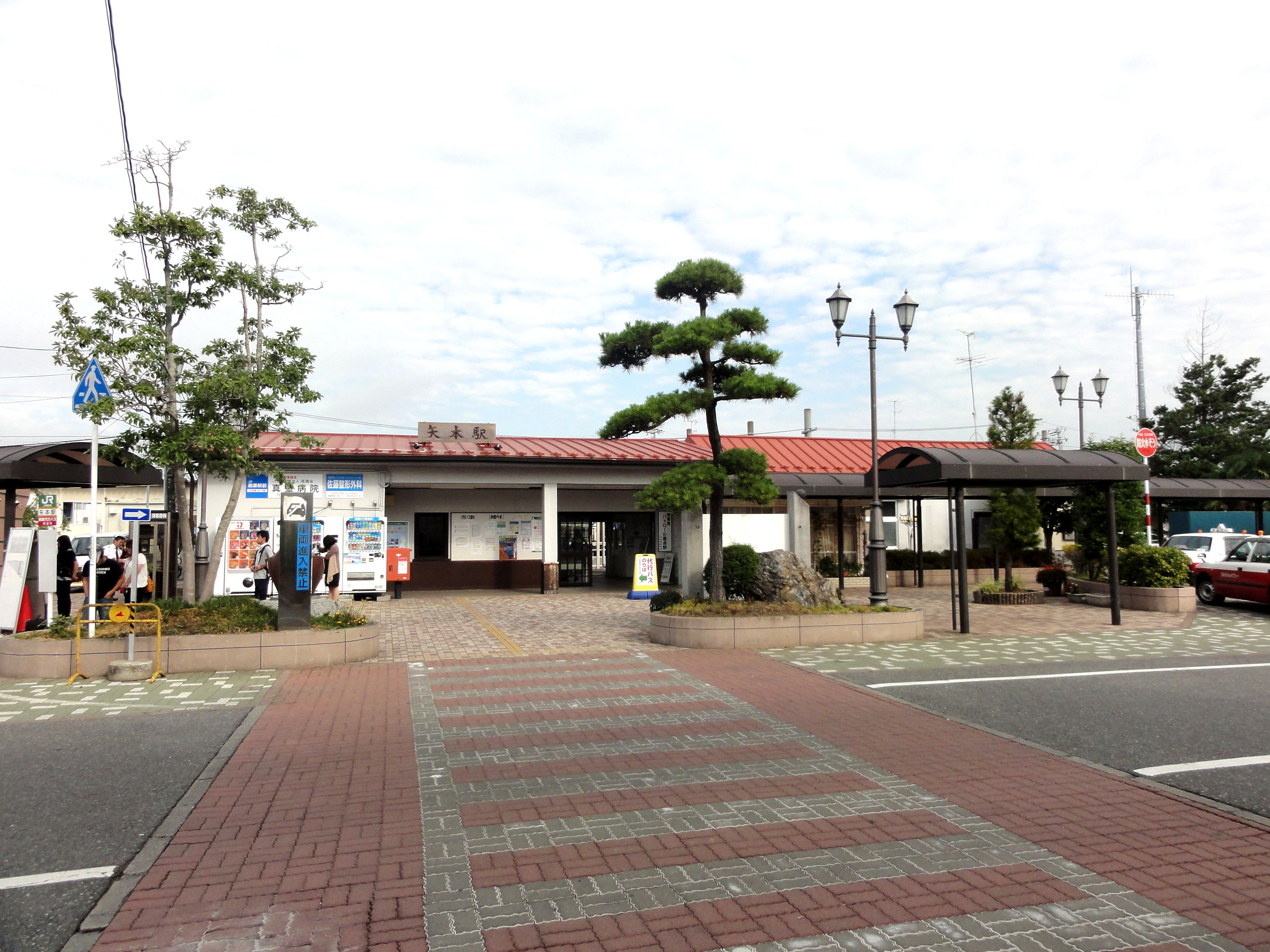
- Yamoto Station, September 2012

General information
- Location: Yamoto-Kawabe 271, Higashimatsushima-shi, Miyagi-ken 981-0503; Japan
- Coordinates: 38.4210°N 141.2099°E
- Operator: JR East
- Lines: ■ Senseki Line; ■ Senseki-Tōhoku Line
- Distance: 40.2 km from Aoba-dōri
- Platforms: 1 island platform
- Tracks: 2

Other information
- Status: Staffed (Midori no Madoguchi)
- Website: Official website

History
- Opened: November 22, 1928

Passengers
- FY2018: 1,216

Services
| Preceding station | JR East | Following station |
|---|---|---|
| Takagimachi towards Sendai | Senseki-Tōhoku Line Special Rapid | Ishinomaki Terminus |
| Rikuzen-Ono towards Sendai | Senseki-Tōhoku Line Rapid | Rikuzen-Akai towards Onagawa |
| Rikuzen-Ono towards Sendai | Senseki-Tōhoku Line Rapid | Rikuzen-Akai towards Ishinomaki |
| Kazuma towards Aoba-dori | Senseki Line | Higashi-Yamoto towards Ishinomaki |
Location
- Location within Miyagi Prefecture Location within Japan

Yamoto Station (矢本駅, Yamoto-eki) is a railway station in the city of Higashimatsushima, Miyagi Prefecture, Japan, operated by East Japan Railway Company (JR East).

== Lines ==
Yamoto Station is served by the Senseki Line. It is located 40.2 rail kilometers from the terminus of the Senseki Line at Aoba-dōri Station. It is also served by trains of the Senseki-Tōhoku Line.

== Station layout ==
The station has one island platform connected to the station building by a level crossing. The station has a Midori no Madoguchi staffed ticket office.

=== Platforms ===
| 1 | ■ Senseki Line | for Matsushima-Kaigan and Aoba-dōri |
| | ■ Senseki-Tōhoku Line | for Shiogama and Sendai |
| 2 | ■ Senseki Line | for Ishinomaki |
| | ■ Senseki-Tōhoku Line | for Ishinomaki |

== History ==
Yamoto Station opened on November 22, 1928 as a station on the Miyagi Electric Railway. The Miyagi Electric Railway was nationalized on May 1, 1944. The station was absorbed into the JR East network upon the privatization of JNR on April 1, 1987.

The station was closed from March 11, 2011 due to damage to the line associated with the 2011 Tōhoku earthquake and tsunami, and services were replaced by provisional bus services. Services reopened on July 16, 2011 to Ishinomaki and on March 17, 2012 to Rikuzen-Ono; services past Rikuzen-Ono the direction of Sendai were resumed on May 30, 2015.

== Passenger statistics ==
In fiscal 2018, the station was used by an average of 1,216 passengers daily (boarding passengers only).

== Surrounding area ==
- National Route 45
- former Yamoto Town Hall
- Yamoto Post Office

== See also ==
- List of railway stations in Japan
