= Tsutsujigaoka Station =

Tsutsujigaoka Station the name of two train stations in Japan.

1. Tsutsujigaoka Station (Miyagi) (榴ヶ岡駅), in Sendai, Miyagi Prefecture
2. Tsutsujigaoka Station (Tokyo) (つつじヶ丘駅), in Tokyo
