= Sendai Sun Plaza =

Hotel in Miyagino-ku, Miyagi Prefecture, Japan

Coordinates: 38°15′29″N 140°53′39″E

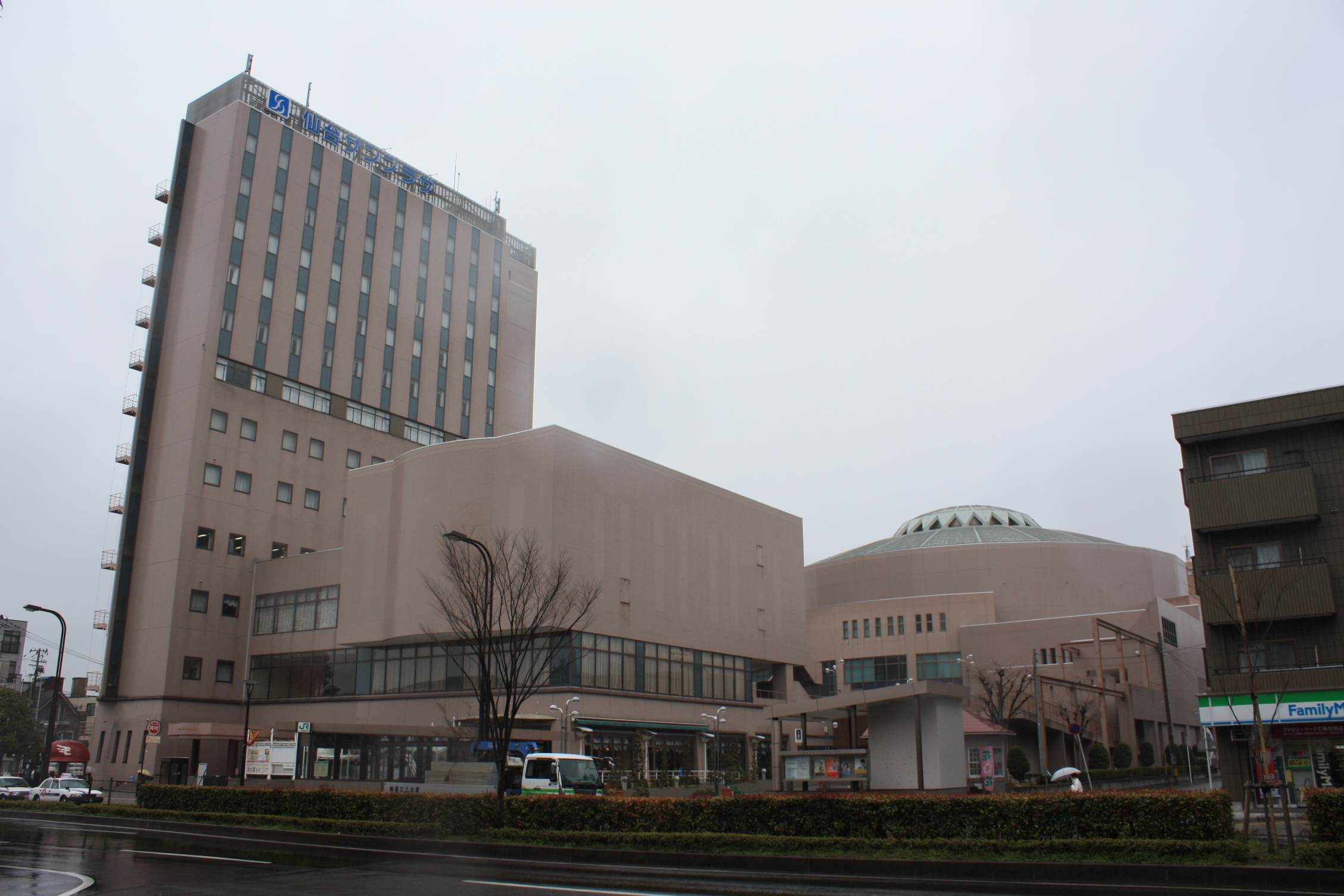
- Sendai Sunplaza Hotel in April 2009
- Interactive map of the Sendai Sun Plaza area
- Hotel chain: Sun Plaza

General information
- Location: Miyagino-ku, Sendai, Japan
- Opened: June 1991

Technical details
- Grounds: 1 hectare

Other information
- Seating capacity: 2,710
- Number of rooms: 74
- Number of restaurants: 1
- Number of bars: 1

Sendai Sun Plaza (仙台サンプラザ, Sendai San Puraza) is a hotel in Miyagino-ku, Sendai, Miyagi Prefecture. The hotel is adjacent to the JR East underground Tsutsujigaoka Station. The twelve-story structure includes a large three-story theater with seating for up to 2,710 people, which is used as a concert hall and sports venue. It also contains a conference hall, day-care center, wedding facilities and a hotel with 74 rooms. The building was completed in June 1991.

== See also ==
- Nakano Sun Plaza
- Hiroshima Sun Plaza
