= Higashimatsushima =

Higashi-Matsushima City 東松島市
- City
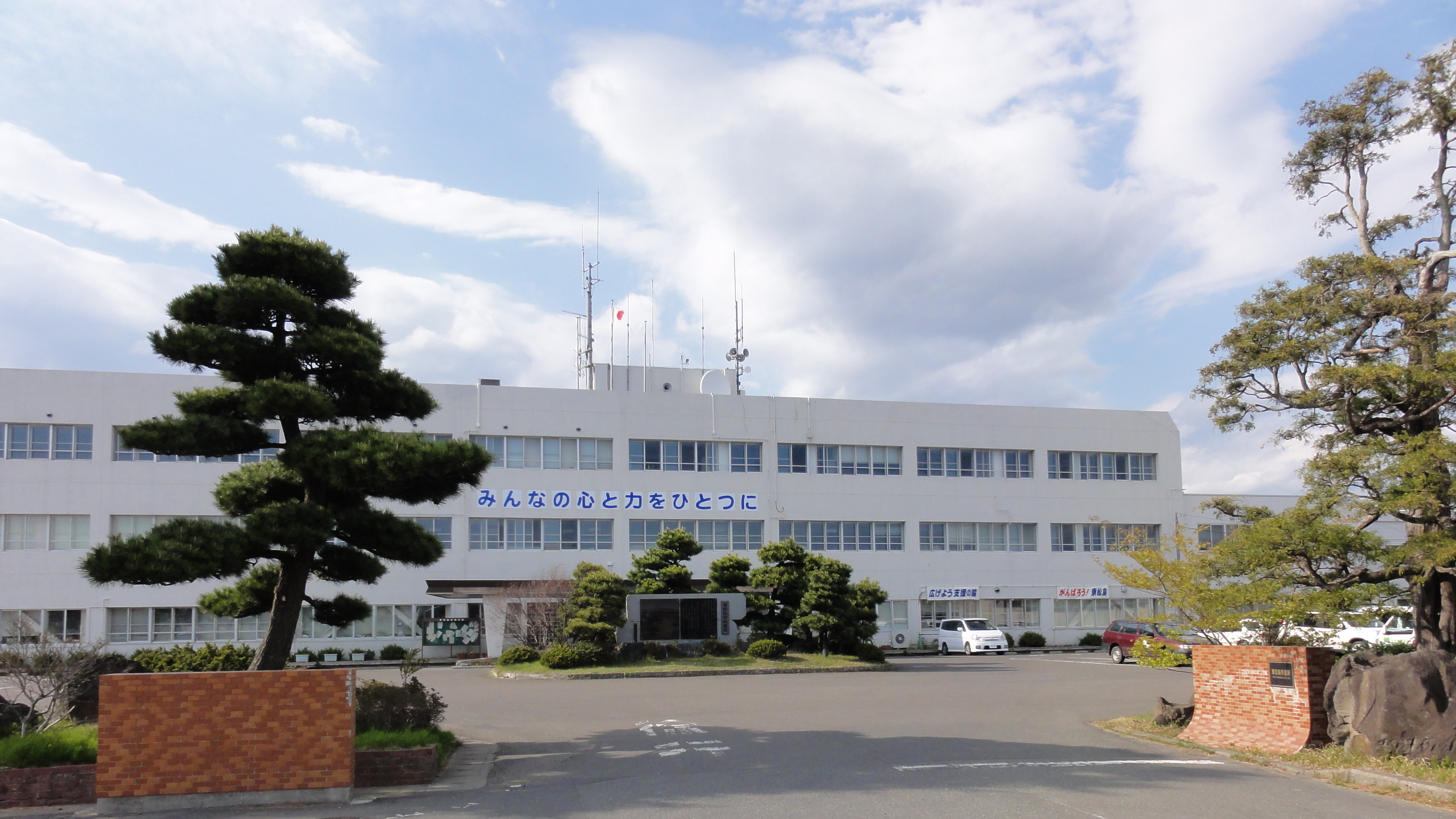
- Higashi-Matsushima City Hall

- Flag Seal

- Location of Higashi-Matsushima in Miyagi Prefecture

- Coordinates: 38°25′34.5″N 141°12′37.5″E
- Country: Japan
- Region: Tōhoku
- Prefecture: Miyagi

Government
  - Mayor: Iwao Atsumi

Area
  - Total: 101.36 km^{2} (39.14 sq mi)

Population (October 10, 2020)
  - Total: 39,098
  - Density: 385.73/km^{2} (999.05/sq mi)
- Time zone: UTC+9 (Japan Standard Time)
- Phone number: 0225-82-1111
- Address: 36-1 Kamikawado, Yamoto, Higashimatsushima-shi, Miyagi-ken 981-0503
- Climate: Cfa
- Website: Official website (in Japanese)
- Symbols
- Flower: Sakura
- Tree: Pine

Higashi-Matsushima (東松島市, Higashimatsushima-shi) is a city located in Miyagi Prefecture, Japan. As of 1 June 2020, the city had an estimated population of 39,580 in 16102 households, and a population density of 390 persons per km^{2}. The total area of the city is 101.36 square kilometres (39.14 sq mi).

== Geography ==
Higashi-Matsushima (lit. "East Matsushima") is in eastern Miyagi Prefecture in the Tōhoku region of northern Honshu. The city borders on Matsushima Bay to the west, and the Pacific Ocean (Ishinomaki Bay) to the south. Its coastline forms part of the Sanriku Fukkō National Park, which stretches north to Aomori Prefecture.

=== Neighboring municipalities ===
Miyagi Prefecture

- Ishinomaki
- Matsushima
- Misato

=== Climate ===
Higashi-Matsushima has a humid subtropical climate (Köppen climate classification Cfa) characterized by mild summers and cold winters. The average annual temperature in Higashi-Matsushima is 12.2 °C (54.0 °F). The average annual rainfall is 1,191 millimetres (46.9 in) with September as the wettest month. The temperatures are highest on average in August, at around 24.6 °C (76.3 °F), and lowest in January, at around 0.8 °C (33.4 °F).

Climate data for Higashimatsushima (elevation 4 m, 2011−2020 normals, extremes 2011−present)
| Month | Jan | Feb | Mar | Apr | May | Jun | Jul | Aug | Sep | Oct | Nov | Dec | Year |
|---|---|---|---|---|---|---|---|---|---|---|---|---|---|
| Record high °C (°F) | 12.5 (54.5) | 19.6 (67.3) | 21.6 (70.9) | 29.7 (85.5) | 30.7 (87.3) | 31.4 (88.5) | 34.9 (94.8) | 35.8 (96.4) | 33.2 (91.8) | 28.7 (83.7) | 21.9 (71.4) | 16.6 (61.9) | 35.8 (96.4) |
| Mean daily maximum °C (°F) | 5.0 (41.0) | 5.9 (42.6) | 10.5 (50.9) | 15.1 (59.2) | 20.6 (69.1) | 23.1 (73.6) | 26.7 (80.1) | 28.8 (83.8) | 25.5 (77.9) | 19.9 (67.8) | 13.7 (56.7) | 7.4 (45.3) | 16.9 (62.3) |
| Daily mean °C (°F) | 0.8 (33.4) | 1.3 (34.3) | 5.2 (41.4) | 9.8 (49.6) | 15.6 (60.1) | 19.1 (66.4) | 22.8 (73.0) | 24.6 (76.3) | 21.0 (69.8) | 14.8 (58.6) | 8.4 (47.1) | 2.9 (37.2) | 12.2 (53.9) |
| Mean daily minimum °C (°F) | −3.4 (25.9) | −3.2 (26.2) | −0.3 (31.5) | 4.2 (39.6) | 11.3 (52.3) | 15.9 (60.6) | 20.0 (68.0) | 21.3 (70.3) | 17.0 (62.6) | 9.7 (49.5) | 3.2 (37.8) | −1.2 (29.8) | 7.9 (46.2) |
| Record low °C (°F) | −13.0 (8.6) | −13.3 (8.1) | −6.6 (20.1) | −2.2 (28.0) | 3.7 (38.7) | 8.9 (48.0) | 13.8 (56.8) | 13.3 (55.9) | 7.2 (45.0) | 1.0 (33.8) | −4.6 (23.7) | −9.9 (14.2) | −13.3 (8.1) |
| Average precipitation mm (inches) | 34.1 (1.34) | 25.1 (0.99) | 79.1 (3.11) | 97.1 (3.82) | 94.3 (3.71) | 100.7 (3.96) | 135.1 (5.32) | 118.6 (4.67) | 157.5 (6.20) | 147.6 (5.81) | 48.0 (1.89) | 43.3 (1.70) | 1,089.4 (42.89) |
| Average precipitation days (≥ 1.0 mm) | 4.8 | 5.7 | 6.7 | 8.3 | 9.2 | 8.4 | 11.5 | 10.3 | 10.3 | 8.2 | 5.8 | 6.7 | 95.9 |
Source: Japan Meteorological Agency

== Demographics ==
Per Japanese census data, the population of Higashi-Matsushima has been mostly increasing over the past 40 years.

Historical population
| Year | Pop. | ±% |
|---|---|---|
| 1920 | 19,142 | — |
| 1930 | 21,862 | +14.2% |
| 1940 | 23,423 | +7.1% |
| 1950 | 37,363 | +59.5% |
| 1960 | 33,654 | −9.9% |
| 1970 | 32,192 | −4.3% |
| 1980 | 36,865 | +14.5% |
| 1990 | 40,424 | +9.7% |
| 2000 | 43,180 | +6.8% |
| 2010 | 42,903 | −0.6% |
| 2020 | 39,098 | −8.9% |

== History ==
The area of present-day Higashi-Matsushima was part of ancient Mutsu Province, and has been settled since at least the Jōmon period by the Emishi people. During the Nara period, the area came under the control of colonists from the imperial dynasty based at nearby Tagajō. During the Sengoku period, the area was contested by various samurai clans before the area came under the control of the Date clan of Sendai Domain during the Edo period. Following the Meiji restoration, the area was organized into Monō District, Miyagi Prefecture. The town of Yamoto was created on April 1, 1940 and the town of Naruse on May 3, 1955.

The city of Higashi-Matsushima was created on April 1, 2005, when the towns of Naruse and Yamoto were merged.

== 2011 Tōhoku earthquake and tsunami ==
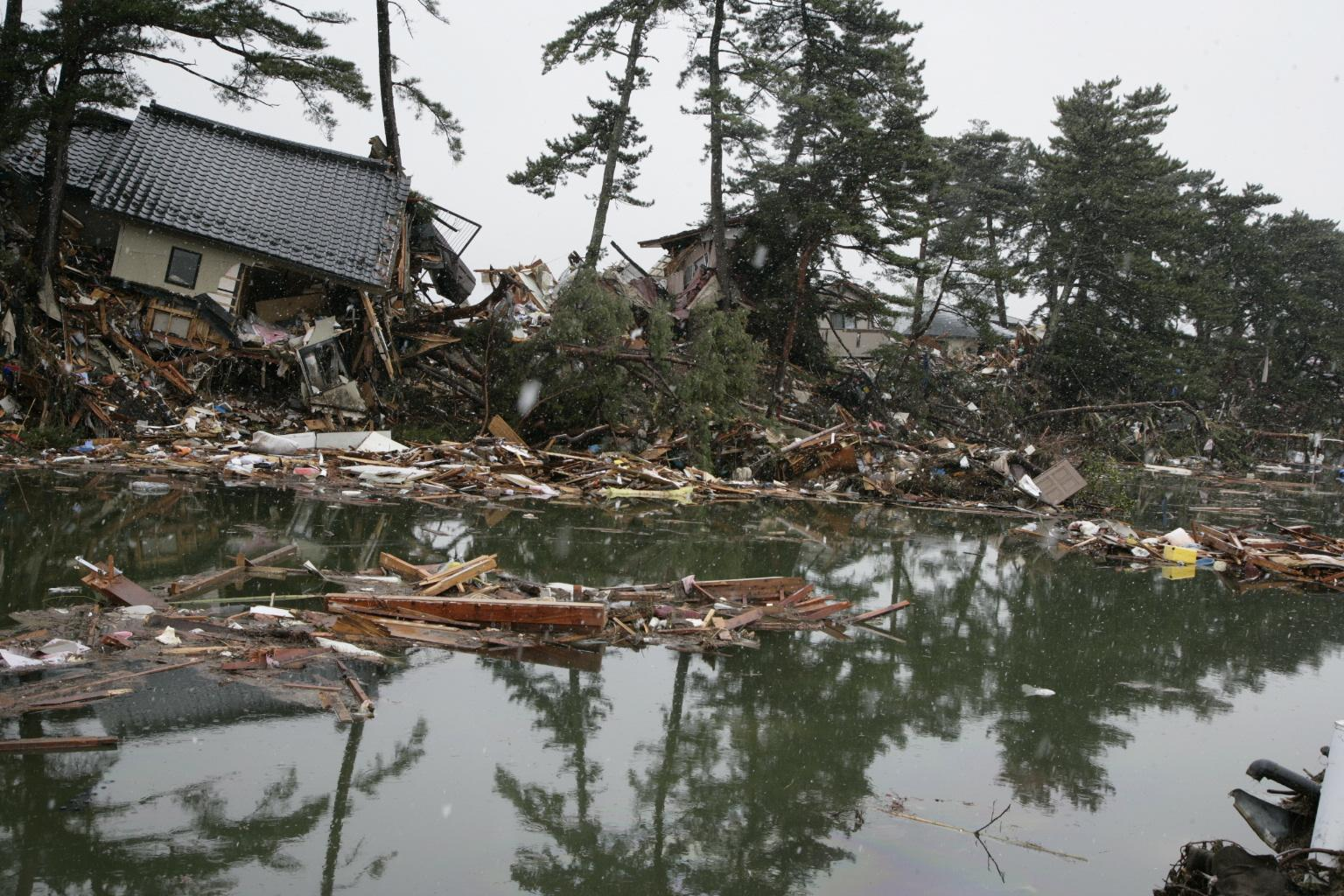
Houses inundated and collapsed by the tsunami in Nobiru, Higashimatsushima

On March 11, 2011, Higashi-Matsushima was severely hit by the 2011 Tōhoku earthquake and tsunami resulting in at least 1,039 deaths, and the destruction of over 11,000 structures, or approximately two-thirds of the buildings in the city limits. During the tsunami, a 45-metre ship, the Chōkai Maru, was hurled over a pier and left aground in the city. At the time of the disaster, Higashi-Matsushima had still not fully recovered from a previous major earthquake in 2003. About 63% of the town was inundated by the tsunami.

== Government ==
Higashi-Matsushima has a mayor-council form of government with a directly elected mayor and a unicameral city legislature of 18 members. Higashi-Matsushima contributes one seat to the Miyagi Prefectural legislature. In terms of national politics, the city is part of Miyagi 5th district of the lower house of the Diet of Japan.

== Economy ==
Higashi-Matsushima traditionally has been a center for commercial fishing, especially for the cultivation of oysters and on tourism. The Japan Air Self Defense Force’s Matsushima Air Field is located in Higashi-Matsushima.

== Education ==
Higashi-Matsushima has eight public elementary schools and three middle schools operated by the city government, and two public high school operated by the Miyagi Prefectural Board of Education.

== Transportation ==
=== Railway ===
East Japan Railway Company (JR East) - Senseki Line

- Rikuzen-Ōtsuka - Tōna - Nobiru - Rikuzen-Ono - Kazuma - Yamoto - Higashi-Yamoto - Rikuzen-Akai

=== Highway ===
- Sanriku Expressway (Naruse-Okumatsushima, Yamoto, and Ishinomaki interchanges)
- National Route 45

== Local attractions ==
- Satohama shell mound, National Historic Site

== Noted people from Higashi-Matsushima ==
- Yutaka Abe, actor, movie director
- Rina Gonoi, judoka and former Ground Self-Defense Force officer
