= Sendai Station (Miyagi) =

Major railway and metro station in Sendai, Japan

Coordinates: 38°15′37″N 140°52′55″E

N10 T07 Sendai Station 仙台駅
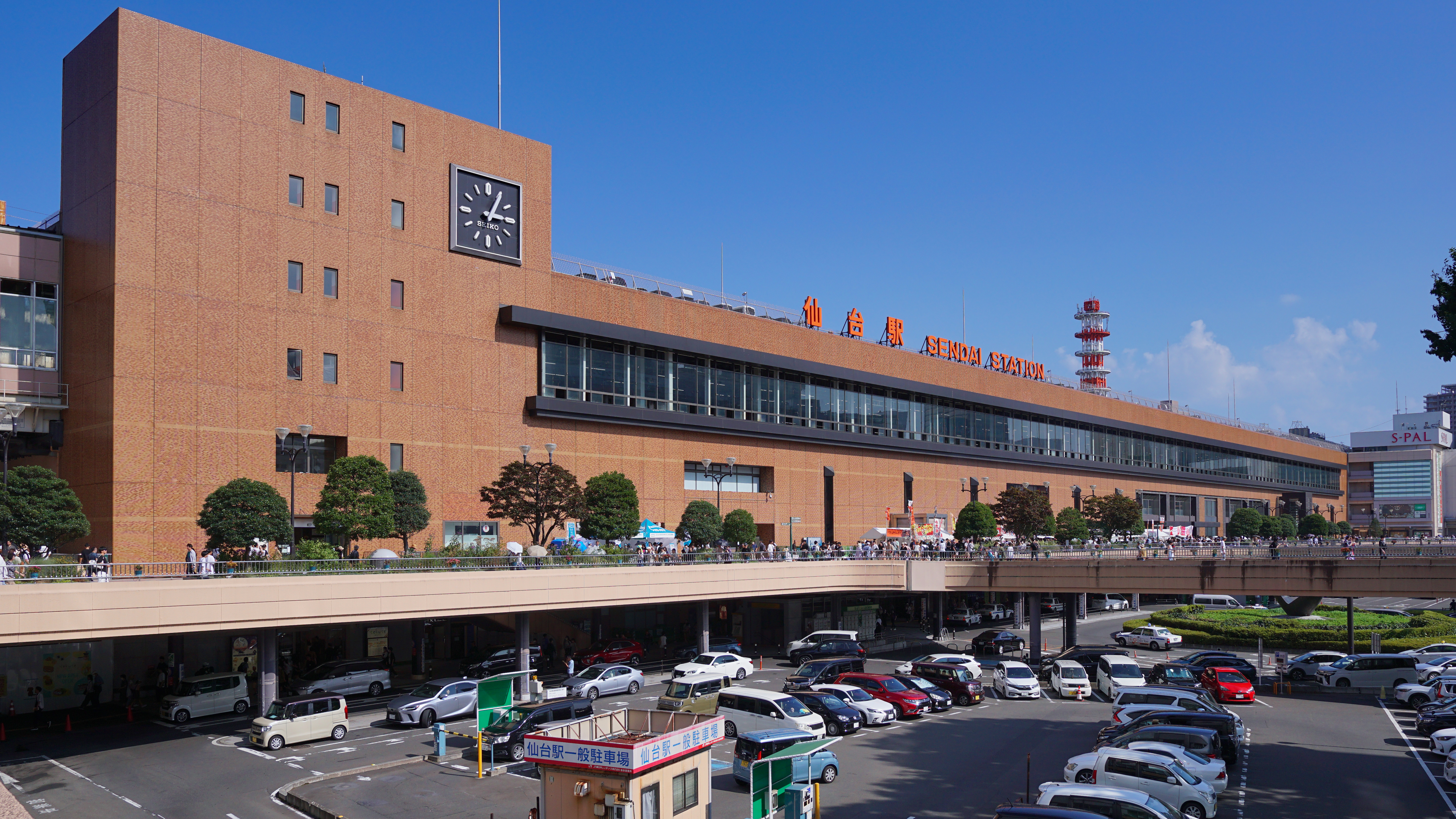
- The west side of Sendai Station in August 2023

General information
- Location: 1 Chuo, Aoba-ku, Sendai-shi, Miyagi-ken; Japan
- Operator: JR East; Sendai Airport Transit; Sendai Subway
- Connections: Bus terminal

Construction
- Accessible: Yes

Other information
- Status: Staffed
- Station code: N10 (Namboku Line); T07 (Tozai Line)

History
- Opened: 15 December 1887; 138 years ago

Passengers
- FY2018: 91,278 daily (JR East); 55,614 daily (Sendai Subway)

Services
Preceding station	JR East	Following station
Ōmiya towards Tokyo	Tōhoku Shinkansen Hayabusa	Furukawa towards Shin-Aomori
Shiroishi-Zaō towards Tokyo	Tōhoku Shinkansen Yamabiko	Furukawa towards Morioka
Ōmiya towards Tokyo	Akita Shinkansen Komachi	Morioka towards Akita
Nagamachi towards Kuroiso	Tōhoku Main Line Local	Higashi-Sendai towards Morioka
Iwanuma towards Shinagawa	Hitachi	Terminus
Nagamachi towards Shinagawa	Jōban Line Local-Futsuu	Terminus
Tōshōgū towards Yamagata	Senzan Line Rapid; Local	Terminus
Terminus	Senseki-Tōhoku Line Special Rapid	Shiogama towards Ishinomaki
Terminus	Senseki-Tōhoku Line Rapid	Shiogama towards Onagawa
Terminus	Senseki-Tōhoku Line Rapid	Higashi-Sendai towards Ishinomaki
Aoba-dori Terminus	Senseki Line	Tsutsujigaoka towards Ishinomaki
Preceding station	Sendai Subway	Following station
Itsutsubashi N11 towards Tomizawa	Namboku Line	Hirose-dori N09 towards Izumi-Chūō
Aoba-dori Ichibancho T06 towards Yagiyama Zoological Park	Tōzai Line	Miyagino-dori T08 towards Arai
Preceding station	Sendai Airport Transit	Following station
Nagamachi towards Sendai Airport	Sendai Airport Line	Terminus
Location
- Location within Sendai Location within Miyagi Prefecture Location within Japan

Sendai Station (Japanese: 仙台駅, Hepburn: Sendai-eki) is a major junction railway station in Aoba-ku, Sendai, Miyagi, Japan. It is a stop for all Akita, Hokkaido, and Tohoku Shinkansen trains, the eastern terminus for the Senzan Line, and major stop on both the Tohoku Main Line and Senseki Line. It is located on the border between Miyagino and Aoba Wards in Sendai, Miyagi Prefecture.

== Lines ==
Sendai Station is served by services operated by East Japan Railway Company (JR East), Sendai Airport Transit, and Sendai Subway. The station is served by the following lines.

=== JR East ===
- Tōhoku Shinkansen
- Akita Shinkansen
- ■ Tohoku Main Line
- ■ Senzan Line
- ■ Senseki Line
- ■ Joban Line

=== Sendai Airport Transit ===
- Sendai Airport Line

=== Sendai Subway ===
- Namboku Line
- Tōzai Line

== Station layout ==
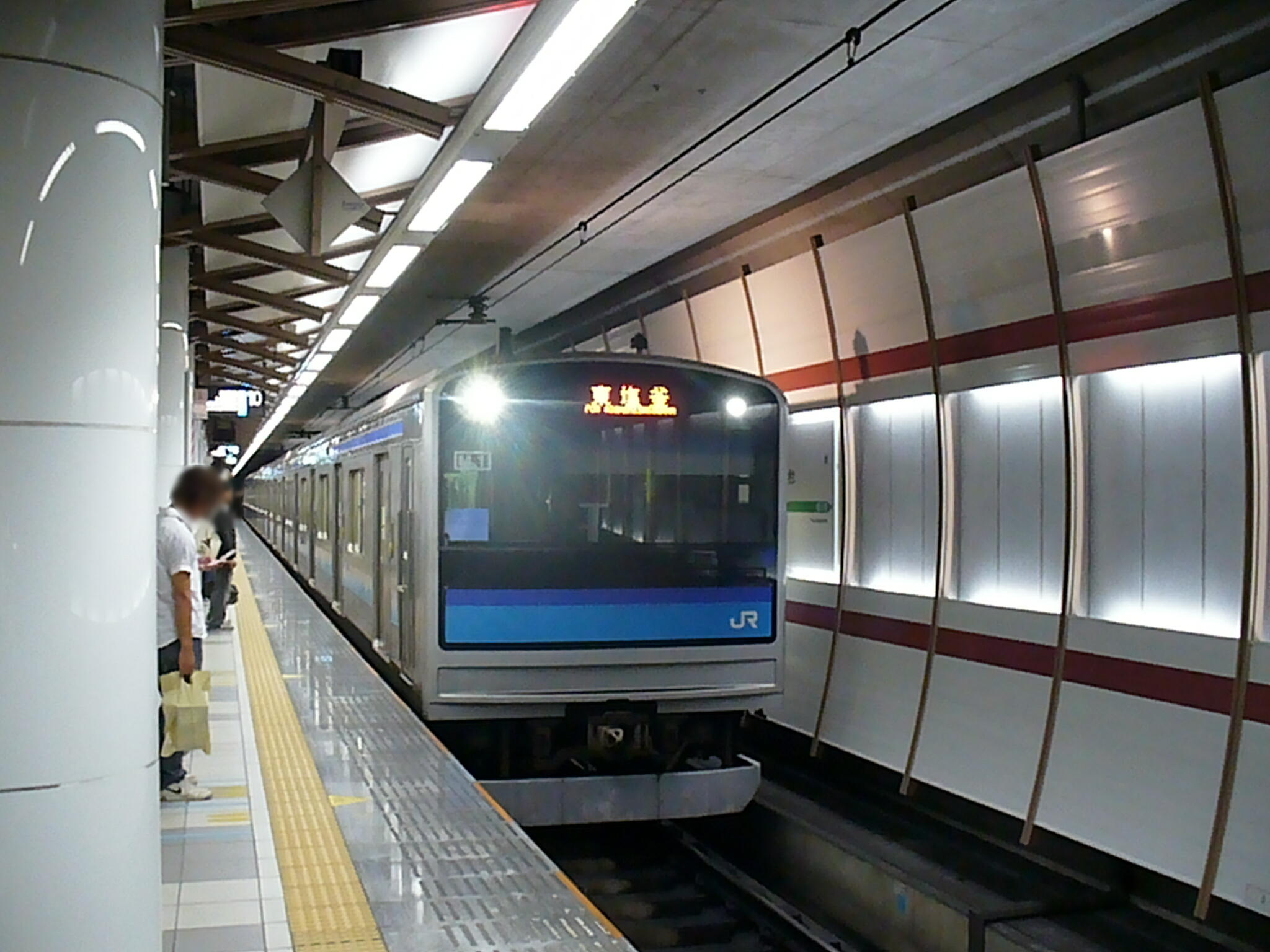
Senseki Line underground platforms

=== JR East ===
Although the main JR train station and the subway station are physically separate, there are underground passageways connecting the two. The main Sendai Station is above-ground, and is a hub for JR East containing both the Tohoku and Akita Shinkansen lines and several other local lines. The above-ground portion of Sendai Station lies in Aoba-ku, and is situated so that tracks run roughly north–south. In the station's easternmost section, underground and across the ward border in Miyagino-ku, is the platform for the east–west Senseki Line. Originally, this platform was also above ground; but in 2000, the line was extended to Aoba-dōri to the west, and the line was re-routed underground beneath the rest of the station.

==== Platforms ====
On the ground level, there are 4 platforms serving 8 tracks. On the 2nd basement, there is an island platform with 2 tracks for the Senseki Line. On the 3rd floor, there is 2 platforms serving 4 tracks of the Tohoku Shinkansen line.

Platform	Line	Direction
Conventional Line – Ground Level Platforms
1・2	■ Tōhoku Main Line	for Iwakiri・Rifu・Shiogama・Kogota
1・2	■■ Senseki Tohoku Line	for Ishinomaki
3	■ Tohoku Main Line	Iwanuma・Shiroishi・Fukushima
3	■ Sendai Airport Line	for Sendai Airport
4	■■ Senseki Tohoku Line	for Ishinomaki
4	■ Tohoku Main Line	for Iwakiri・Rifu・Shiogama・Kogota
4	■ Tohoku Main Line	for Iwanuma・Shiroishi・Fukushima
4	■ Jōban Line	for Watari・Soma・Haranomachi
4	■ Sendai Airport Line	for Sendai Airport
5	■■ Senseki Tohoku Line	for Ishinomaki
5	■ Tohoku Main Line	for Iwanuma・Shiroishi・Fukushima
5	■ Joban Line	for Watari・Soma・Haranomachi
6	■ Tohoku Main Line	for Iwanuma・Shiroishi・Fukushima
6	■ Joban Line	for Watari・Soma・Haranomachi
7・8	■ Senzan Line	for Ayashi・Sakunami・Yamagata
Senseki Line – Underground Platform
9	■ Senseki Line	for Aoba-dōri
10	■ Senseki Line	for Matsushima Kaigan・Ishinomaki
Shinkansen – Elevated Platform
11・12	Tōhoku Shinkansen; Hokkaido Shinkansen	for Morioka・Shin-Aomori・Shin-Hakodate-Hokuto
11・12	Akita Shinkansen	for Morioka・Akita
13・14	Tōhoku Shinkansen	for Fukushima・Ōmiya・Tokyo

=== Sendai Subway ===
The Sendai Subway lies to the west, and can be accessed from the main station via underground passageways at both ends of the station. The platform for the subway at Sendai Station is actually closer to Aoba-dōri Station than the other JR lines in Sendai Station. In fact, there is a transfer-only gate between the subway and Senseki Line platform at Aoba-dōri Station.

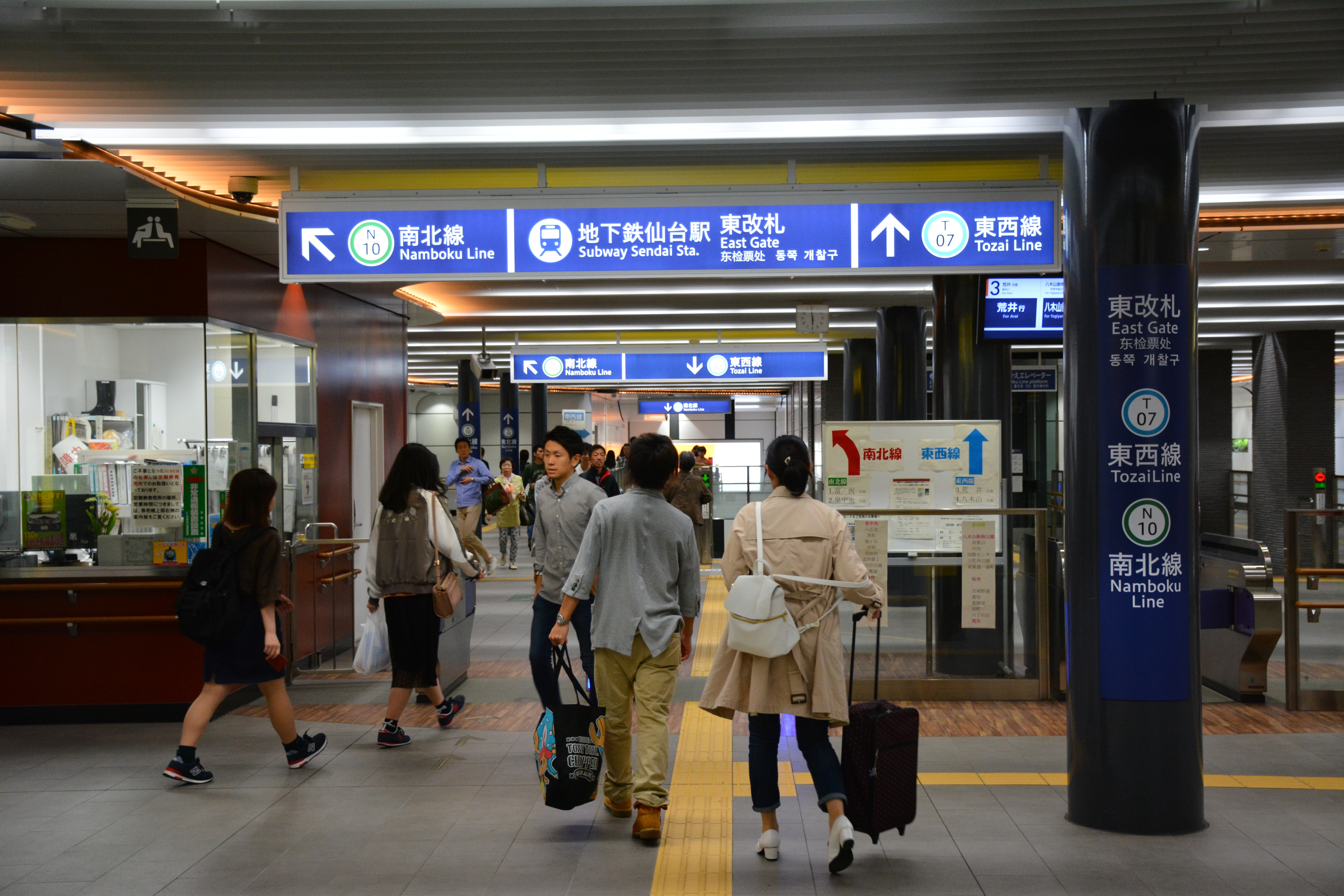
Tōzai Line ticket hall

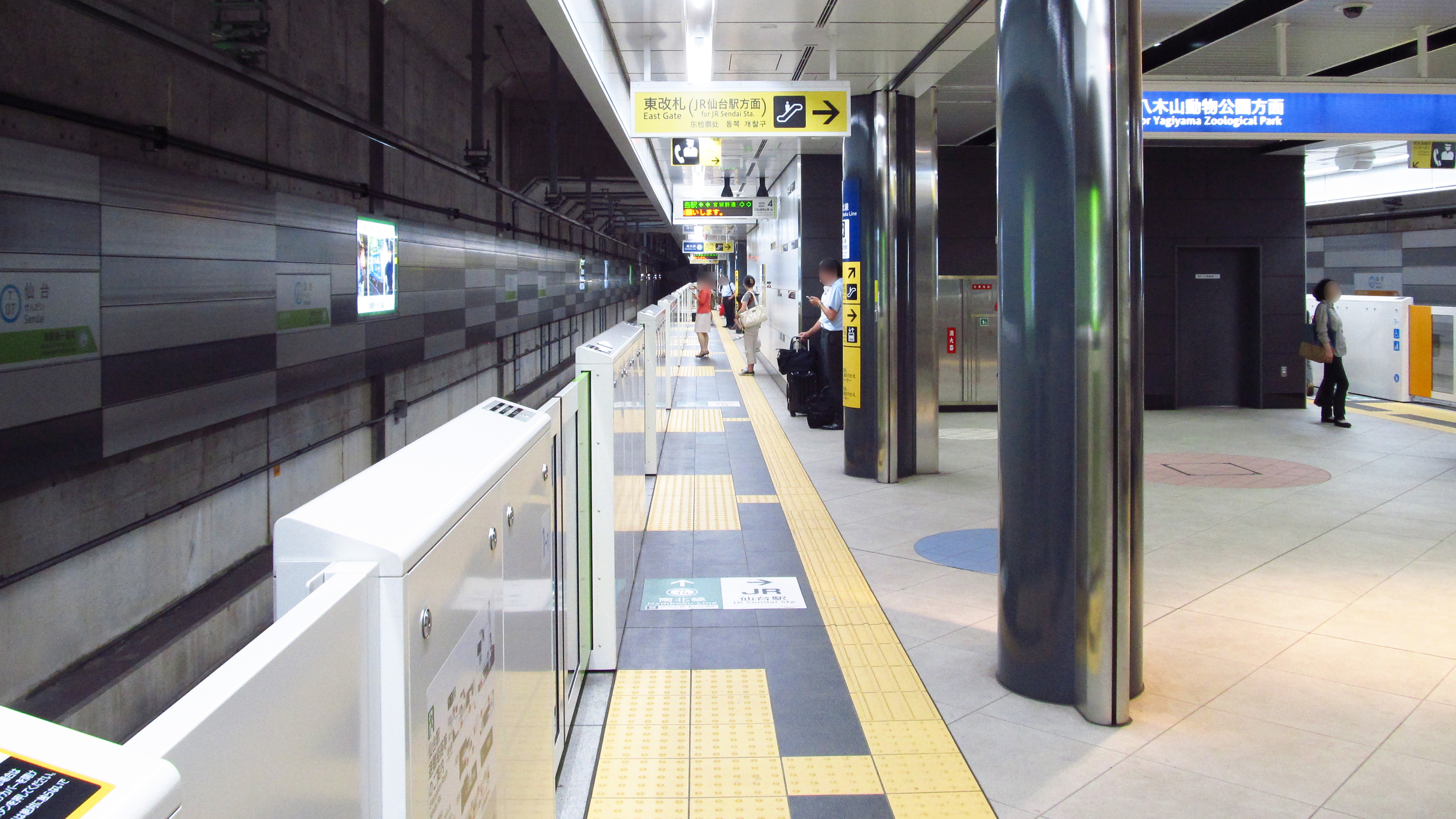
Tōzai Line platform

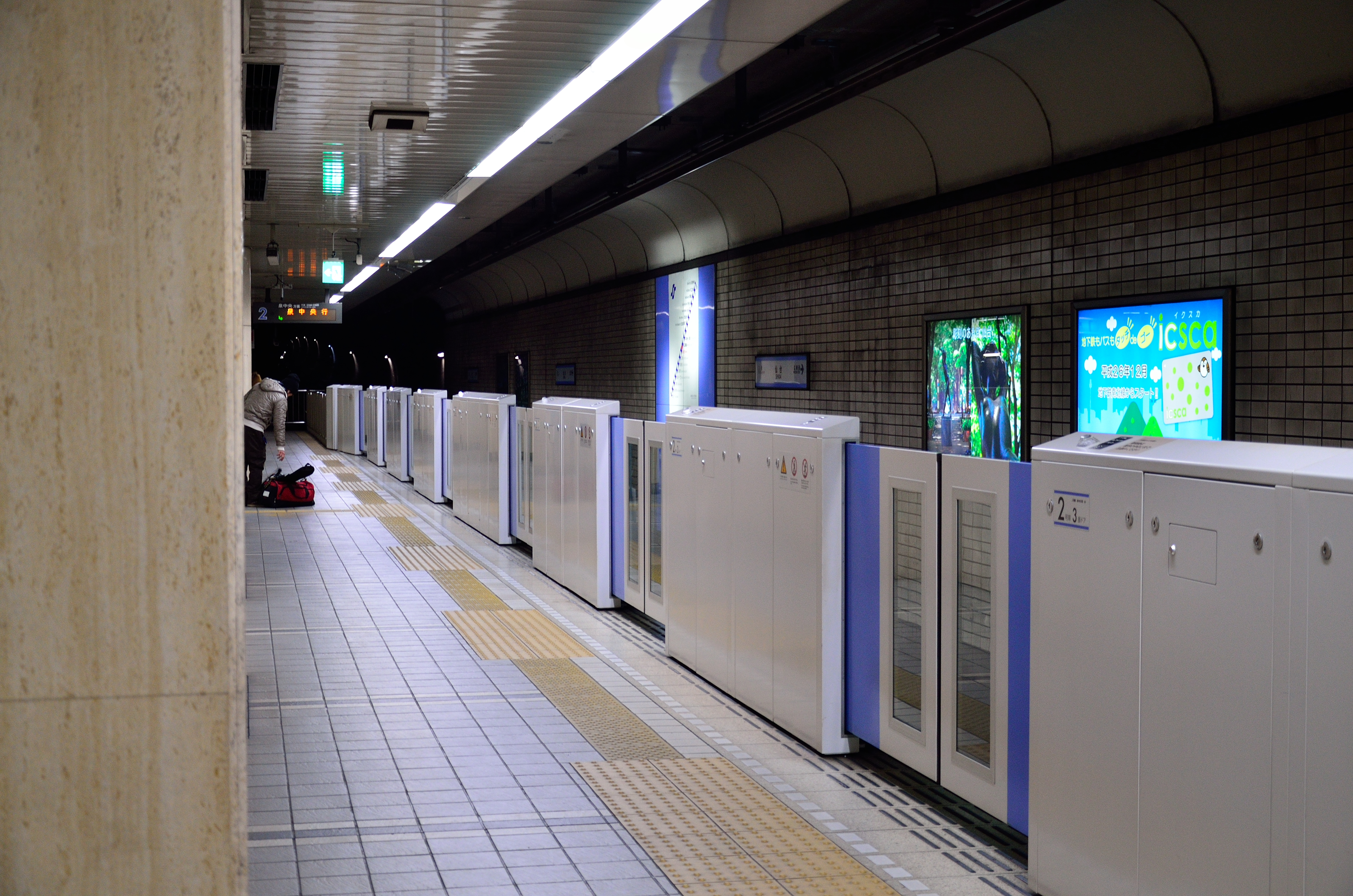
Namboku Line platform

==== Platforms ====
The Namboku Line platforms are located on the third basement ("B3F") level, and the Tōzai Line platforms are located on the fourth basement ("B4F") level.

B3F

1	■ Namboku Line	■ for Tomizawa
2	■ Namboku Line	■ for Izumi-Chūō

B4F

3	■ Tōzai Line	■ for Arai
4	■ Tōzai Line	■ for Yagiyama Zoological Park

== History ==
The station first opened on 15 December 1887.

On October 9, 2023, an accidental chemical spill on a Tohoku Shinkansen train was reported to have stopped at the station. The incident was investigated by firefighters from the Sendai City Fire Department.

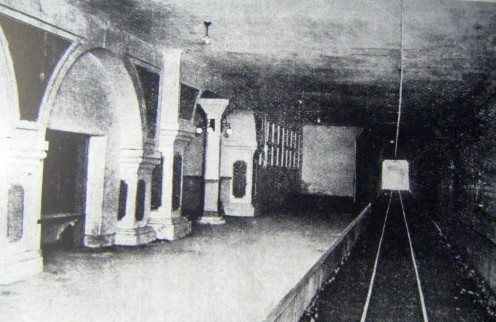
Underground platform in the 1920s

== Passenger statistics ==
In fiscal 2018, the JR East station was used by an average of 91,278 passengers daily (boarding passengers only), making it the busiest JR East station outside the Greater Tokyo Area. It is also the busiest JR East station in Miyagi Prefecture and the 50th-busiest on the JR East network as a whole. In fiscal 2018, the Sendai Subway portion of the station was used by an average of 55,614 passengers daily.

The JR East passenger figures (boarding passengers only) for previous years are as shown below.

Fiscal year	Daily average
1913	1,628
1960	43,089
1971	58,799
1984	64,634
2000	78,195
2005	76,723
2010	74,672
2015	84,964

== Surrounding area ==
=== West (main) exit ===
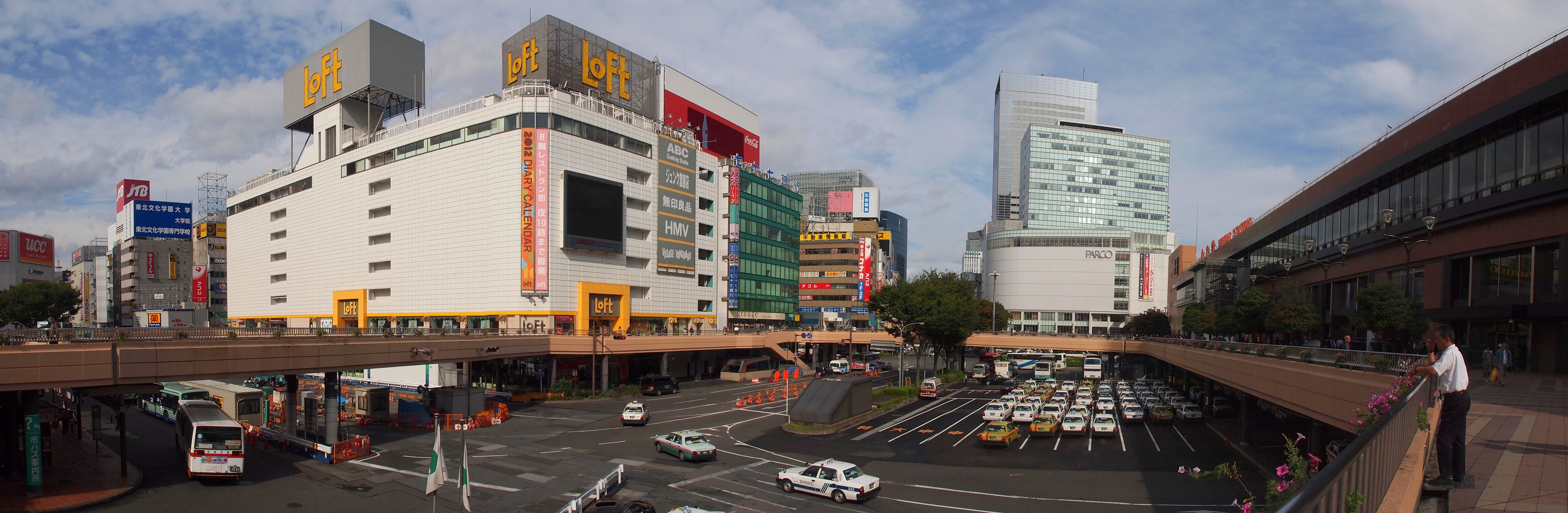
West exit view

The area outside the west exit of Sendai Station is the traditional center of activity around the station. This is because the area is closer to the central business district of Sendai, which initially developed around Sendai Castle.

The area is home to some of the largest department stores in Sendai. The S-Pal department store and the Station are directly connected to each other. A large elevated walkway outside the exit provides access to other department stores, such as the Loft Department Store, Sakurano Department Store, the Jujiya Co. Sendai Store, and EBeanS. EbeanS is home to Junkudo Sendai, the largest bookstore in the Tohoku Region. The AER Building, a large office building built through recent redevelopment, is also located in the area and is home to various offices and stores, such as Maruzen, another large bookstore.

The area around the Asaichi-dori street, next to EBeanS, is known as the Sendai Asaichi (Sendai morning Market), although stores are open all day long. The Asaichi is home to a wide variety of small stores that mainly sell Japanese foods.

The Sendai Metropolitan Hotel can be directly accessed via the elevated walkway and is extremely convenient for visitors unfamiliar with the area. The entrance to Sendai's largest shopping malls, such as the Clis Road Shopping District and the Ichibancho Shopping District, are located close to the exit of the elevated walkway, and a bus exchange area and taxi pool can be found under the walkway.

=== East exit ===
The area outside the east exit of Sendai Station is the "new" side of the station. It traditionally had a smaller concentration of businesses compared to the west side. That the area was not damaged by World War II bombing also delayed development in the area.

The municipal government decided to conduct redevelopment in the area in 1960. The redevelopment project is still in progress, but the area has already been largely renovated with a new bus exchange area and taxi pool. The Yodobashi Camera Sendai Store, one of the largest electronics retailers in Sendai, is located right outside the east exit and BiVi Sendai, a department store, is located close by. The east side of the station is close to many entertainment venues, such as Beeb Sendai and Sendai Sunplaza. Miyagi Baseball Stadium is within walking distance.

=== In popular culture ===
In the film Bullet Train Explosion, Sendai Station has been featured.
