= Ishinomaki Station =

Railway station in Ishinomaki, Miyagi Prefecture, Japan

Ishinomaki Station 石巻駅
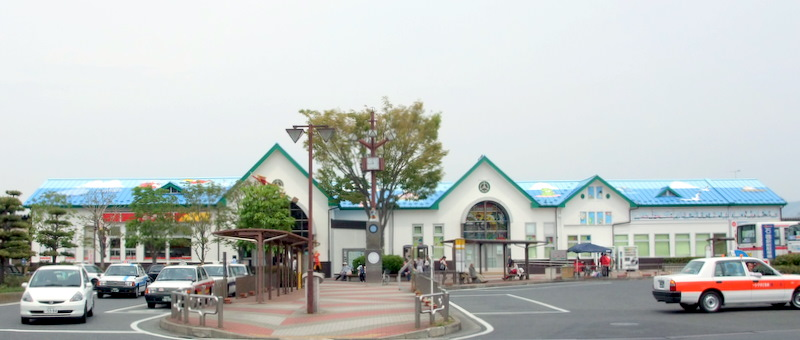
- Ishinomaki Station, May 2009

General information
- Location: Isenba, Ishinomaki-shi, Miyagi-ken 986-0826; Japan
- Coordinates: 38°26′07″N 141°18′13″E
- Operator: JR East
- Lines: ■ Ishinomaki Line; ■ Senseki Line; ■■Senseki-Tōhoku Line
- Distance: 27.9 km from Kogota
- Platforms: 1 bay + side + 1 island platforms
- Tracks: 4

Construction
- Structure type: At grade

Other information
- Status: Staffed ("Midori no Madoguchi")
- Website: Official website

History
- Opened: October 28, 1912

Passengers
- FY2018: 3,343

Services
Preceding station	JR East	Following station
Sobanokami towards Kogota	Ishinomaki Line	Rikuzen-Inai towards Onagawa
Yamoto towards Sendai	Senseki-Tōhoku Line Special Rapid	Terminus
Rikuzen-Yamashita towards Sendai	Senseki-Tōhoku Line Rapid	Rikuzen-Inai towards Onagawa
Rikuzen-Yamashita towards Sendai	Senseki-Tōhoku Line Rapid	Terminus
Rikuzen-Yamashita towards Aoba-dori	Senseki Line	Terminus
Location
- Location within Miyagi Prefecture Location within Japan

Ishinomaki Station (石巻駅, Ishinomaki-eki) is a junction railway station located in the city of Ishinomaki, Miyagi, Japan, operated by East Japan Railway Company (JR East).

== Lines ==
Ishinomaki Station is served by both the Ishinomaki Line and the Senseki Line / Senseki-Tōhoku Line, for which it is a terminal station. It is located 27.9 kilometers from the terminus of the Ishinomaki Line at Kogota Station and 49.0 kilometers from the opposing terminus of the Senseki Line at Aoba-dōri Station, and 47.2 kilometers from the end of the Senseki-Tōhoku Line at Sendai

== Station layout ==
The station has one bay platform for the Senseki Line with two bays, and a side platform and an island platform for the Ishinomaki Line. The platforms are connected by a footbridge. The station has a "Midori no Madoguchi" staffed ticket office.

=== Platforms ===
1	■ Senseki-Tōhoku Line	for Shiogama
2	■ Senseki Line	for Aoba-Dori
3, 4, 5	■ Ishinomaki Line	for Maeyachi and Kogota for Onagawa

== History ==
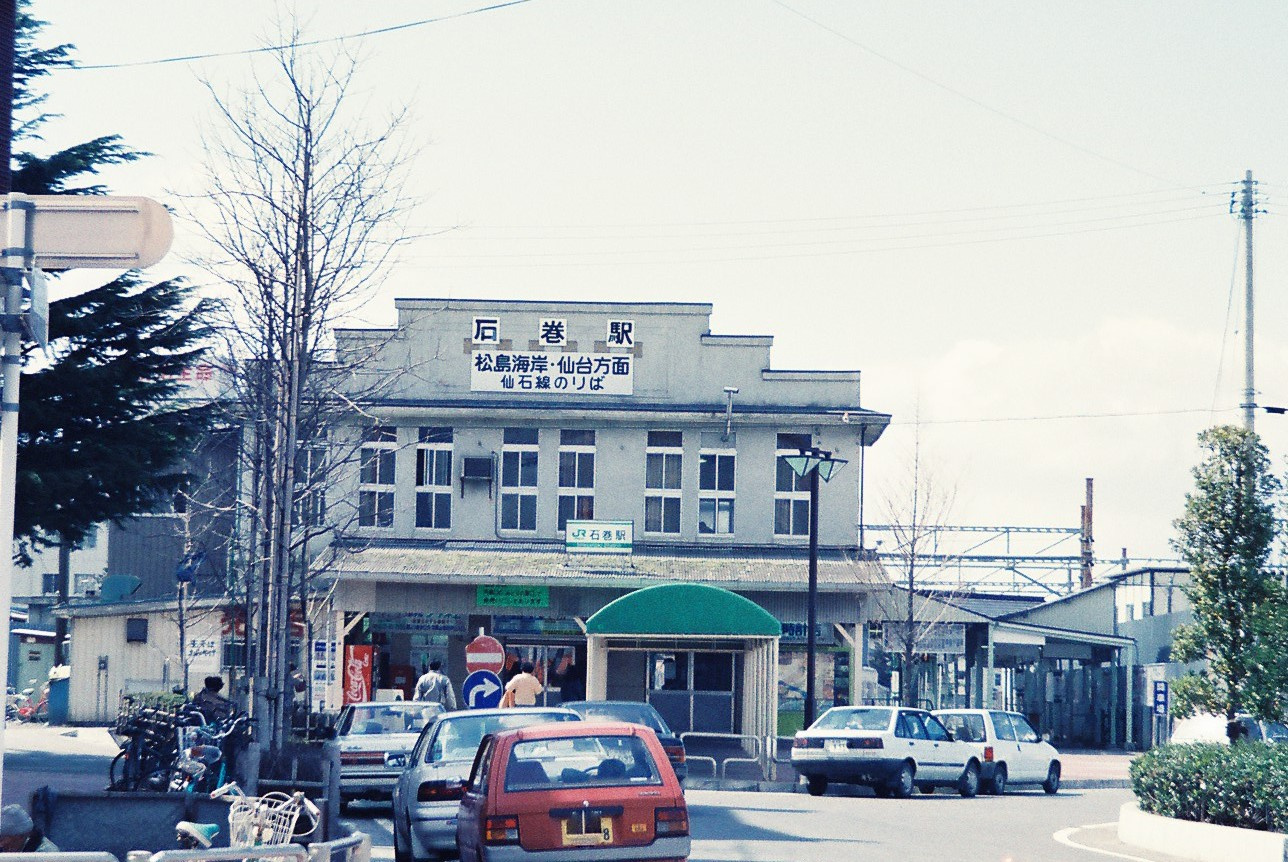
The Senseki Line station in April 1990

Ishinomaki Station opened on October 28, 1912 on what would become the Ishinomaki Line. On November 22, 1928, Miyaden-Ishinomaki Station (宮電石巻駅) opened, served by the Miyagi Electric Railway (the present-day Senseki Line). On May 1, 1944, the Miyagi Electric Railway was nationalized and Miyaden-Ishinomaki Station was renamed Ishinomaki Station, resulting in two nearby stations both named Ishinomaki Station. On July 21, 1990, the Senseki Line and Ishinomaki Line were joined together at a single Ishinomaki Station.

== Passenger statistics ==
In fiscal 2019, the station was used by an average of 3,222 passengers daily (boarding passengers only).

== Surrounding area ==
The station and surrounding streets known as "Manga Road" are adorned with statues of characters created by Shotaro Ishinomori. The entrance to the station features characters from Cyborg 009 and Kamen Rider.

== See also ==
- List of railway stations in Japan
