= Aoba-dōri Station =

Railway station in Sendai, Japan

Aoba-dōri Station あおば通駅
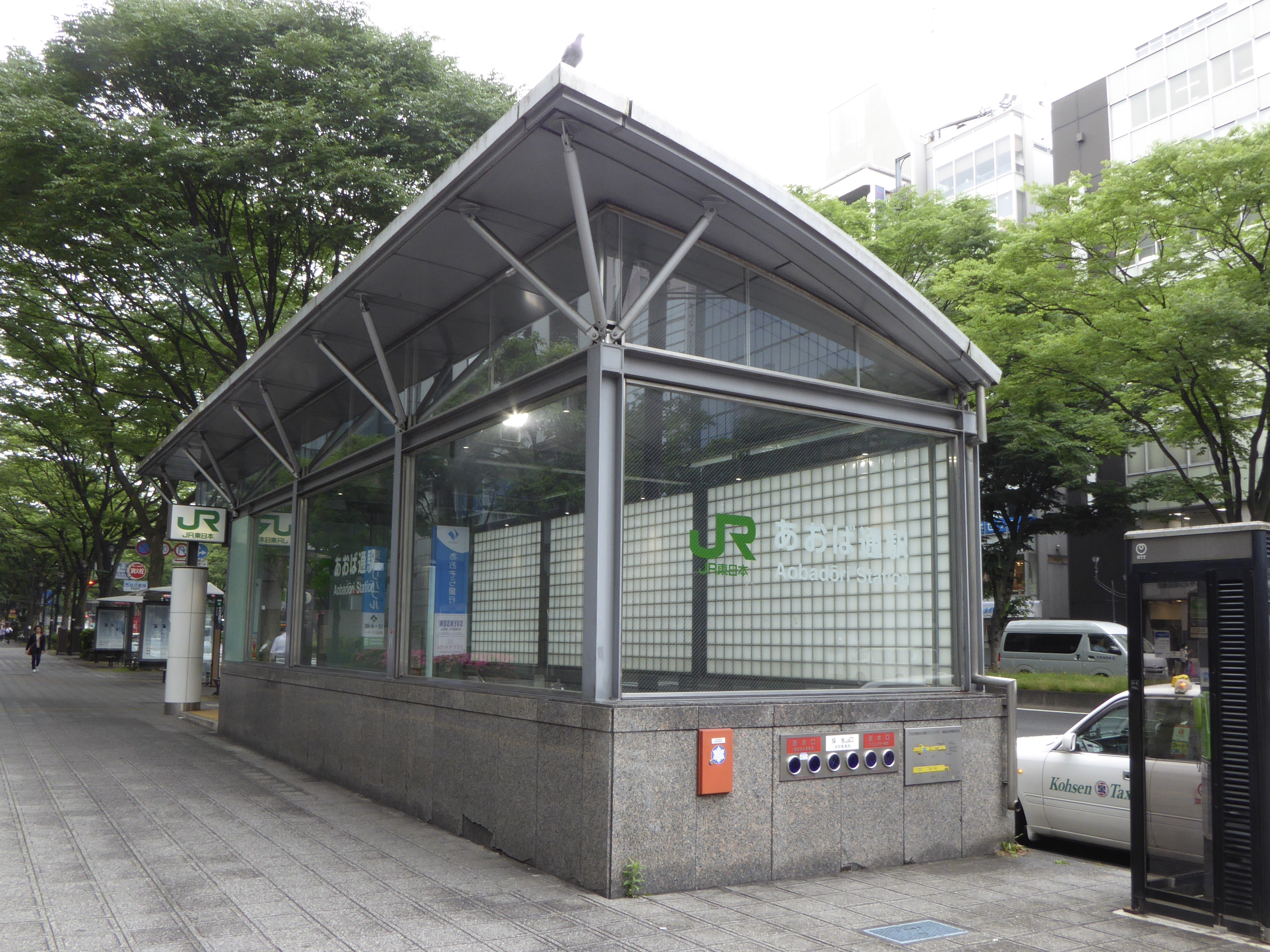
- Aoba-dōri Station entrance in 2022

General information
- Location: Aoba-ku, Sendai, Miyagi; Japan
- Coordinates: 38.2608°N 140.8786°E
- Operator: JR East
- Line: Senseki Line

History
- Opened: March 11, 2000

Services
Preceding station	JR East	Following station
Terminus	Senseki Line	Sendai towards Ishinomaki
Location

Aoba-dōri Station (あおば通駅, Aoba-dōri-eki) is a JR East railway station located in Aoba-ku in Sendai, Miyagi. Its official English name is Aobadori Avenue.

There is a direct transfer gate between the platform of this station to the platform of the Sendai Subway Namboku Line in Sendai Station. The Sendai Subway Tōzai Line is connected through the platform of the Namboku Line. Before the extension of the Senseki Line from Sendai Station, passengers from the subway would have to disembark and walk a good distance to the Senseki Line platform in Sendai Station. It is the departure station for the Mangattan, a "manga train" that runs every Sunday with manga characters from Shotaro Ishinomori's work decorated on the body of the train.

== Description ==
The station began operation on March 11, 2000. The station is built underground with three floors, and services the Senseki Line. The station has an island platform on the second underground floor, while it has a transferring gate with the municipal subway on the third underground floor. Trains service the station from 5 a.m. to 12 a.m., with an interval of 6~43 minutes.
