= Mangokuura Station =

Railway station in Ishinomaki, Miyagi Prefecture, Japan

Mangokuura Station 万石浦駅
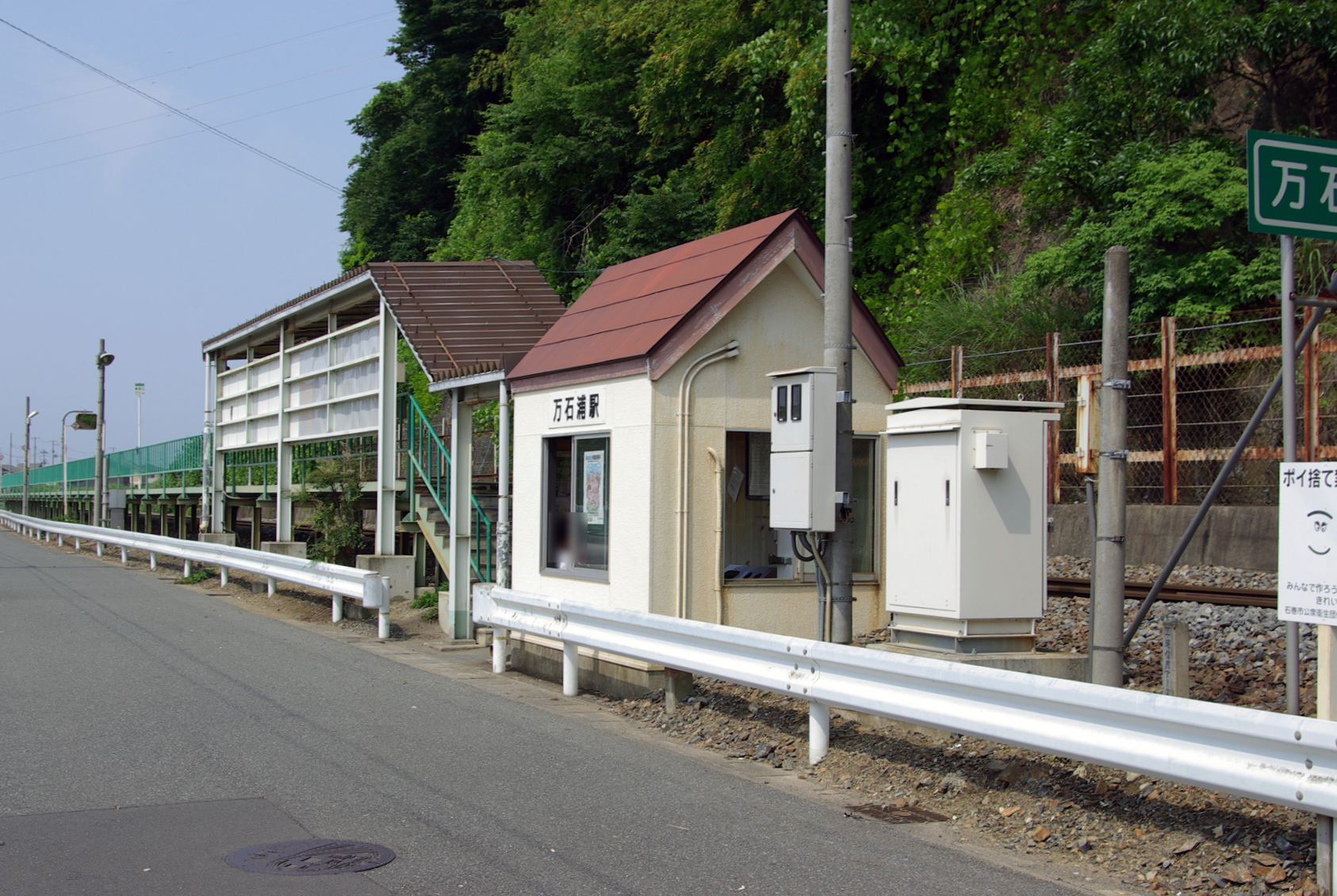
- Mangokuura Station in July 2009

General information
- Location: Nagaru, Ishinomaki-shi, Miyagi-ken 986-2103; Japan
- Coordinates: 38°25′44″N 141°22′07″E
- Operator: JR East
- Line: ■ Ishinomaki Line
- Distance: 37.0 km from Kogota
- Platforms: 1 side platform
- Tracks: 1

Construction
- Structure type: At grade

Other information
- Status: Unstaffed
- Website: Official website

History
- Opened: August 26, 1989

Services
Preceding station	JR East	Following station
Watanoha towards Kogota	Ishinomaki Line	Sawada towards Onagawa
Watanoha towards Sendai	Senseki-Tōhoku Line Rapid	Sawada towards Onagawa
Location
- Location within Miyagi Prefecture Location within Japan

Mangokuura Station (万石浦駅, Mangokuura-eki) is a railway station in the city of Ishinomaki, Miyagi Prefecture, Japan, operated by East Japan Railway Company (JR East).

== Lines ==
Mangokuura Station is served by the Ishinomaki Line, and is located 37.0 kilometers from the terminus of the line at Kogota Station.

== Station layout ==
The station has one side platform, serving a single bi-directional track. The station is unattended.

== History ==
Mangokuura Station opened on August 26, 1989. Operations of the line and the station were suspended by the 2011 Tōhoku earthquake and tsunami of March 11, 2011. Services were resumed on March 16, 2013; but remained suspended on the portion from Urashuku to Onagawa until August 6, 2016.

== Surrounding area ==
- National Route 398
- Mangokuura Port

== See also ==
- List of railway stations in Japan
