= Watanoha Station =

Railway station in Ishinomaki, Miyagi Prefecture, Japan

Watanoha Station 渡波駅
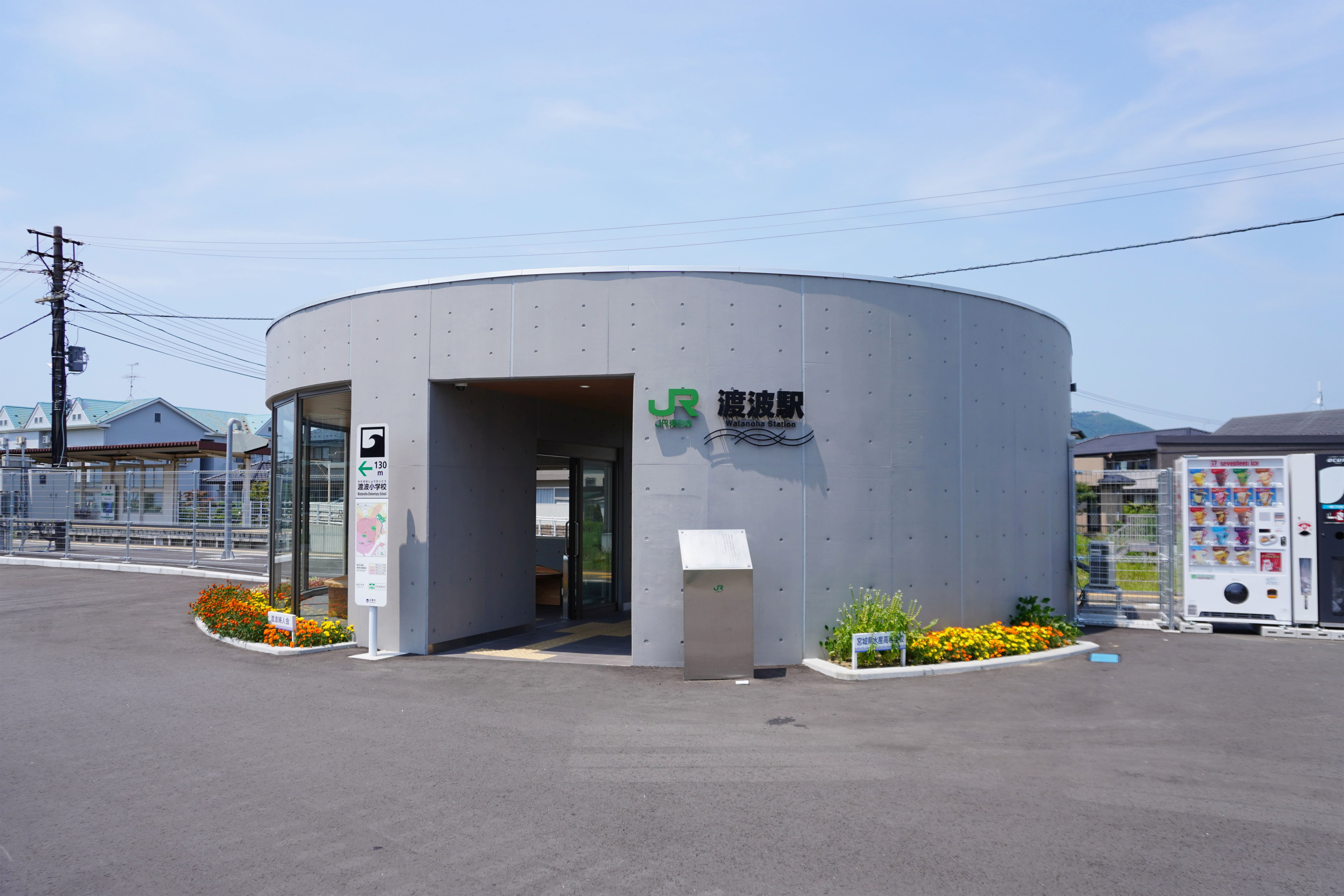
- Watanoha Station in July 2023

General information
- Location: 1-7-1 Watanoha, Ishinomaki-shi, Miyagi-ken 986-2121; Japan
- Coordinates: 38°25′12″N 141°21′55″E
- Operator: JR East
- Lines: ■ Ishinomaki Line; ■ Senseki-Tōhoku Line
- Distance: 35.9 km from Kogota
- Platforms: 2 side platforms
- Tracks: 2

Construction
- Structure type: At grade

Other information
- Status: Staffed
- Website: Official website

History
- Opened: October 7, 1939

Passengers
- FY2018: 543 daily

Services
Preceding station	JR East	Following station
Rikuzen-Inai towards Kogota	Ishinomaki Line	Mangokuura towards Onagawa
Rikuzen-Inai towards Sendai	Senseki-Tōhoku Line Rapid	Mangokuura towards Onagawa
Location
- Location within Miyagi Prefecture Location within Japan

Watanoha Station (渡波駅, Watanoha-eki) is a railway station located in the city of Ishinomaki, Miyagi Prefecture, Japan, operated by East Japan Railway Company (JR East).

== Lines ==
Watanoha Station is served by the Ishinomaki Line, and is located 35.9 kilometers from the terminus of the line at Kogota Station.

== Station layout ==
The station has two opposed side platforms connected to the station building by a level crossing.

=== Platforms ===
1	■ Ishinomaki Line	for Ishinomaki and Kogota
1	■ Senseki-Tōhoku Line	for Ishinomaki and Sendai
2	■ Ishinomaki Line	for Onagawa

== History ==
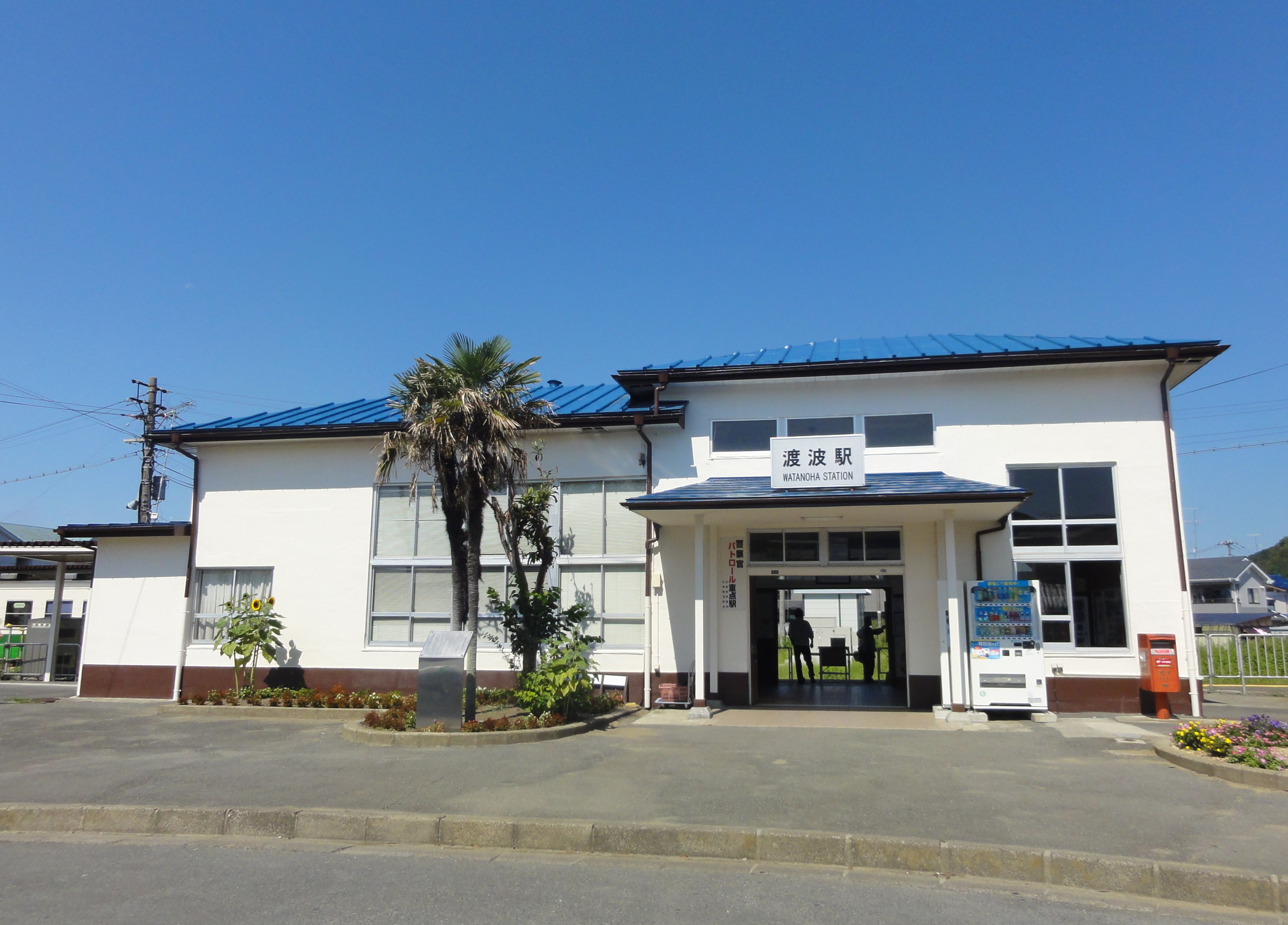
The station building in September 2012

Watanoha Station opened on October 7, 1939. Operations of the line and the station were suspended by the 2011 Tōhoku earthquake and tsunami of March 11, 2011. Services were resumed from Ishinomaki Station to Watanoha on March 17, 2012, and from Watanoha to Urashuku Station on March 16, 2013; but remained suspended on the portion from Urashuku Station to Onagawa Station until August 6, 2016. A new station building was opened on March 24, 2023.

== Surrounding area ==
- Ishinomaki City Hall Watanoha branch office
- National Route 398
- Mangokuura Port
- Watanoha Post Office

== Passenger statistics ==
In fiscal 2018, the station was used by an average of 543 passengers daily (boarding passengers only).

== See also ==
- List of railway stations in Japan
