= Sawada Station =

Railway station in Ishinomaki, Miyagi Prefecture, Japan

Sawada Station 沢田駅
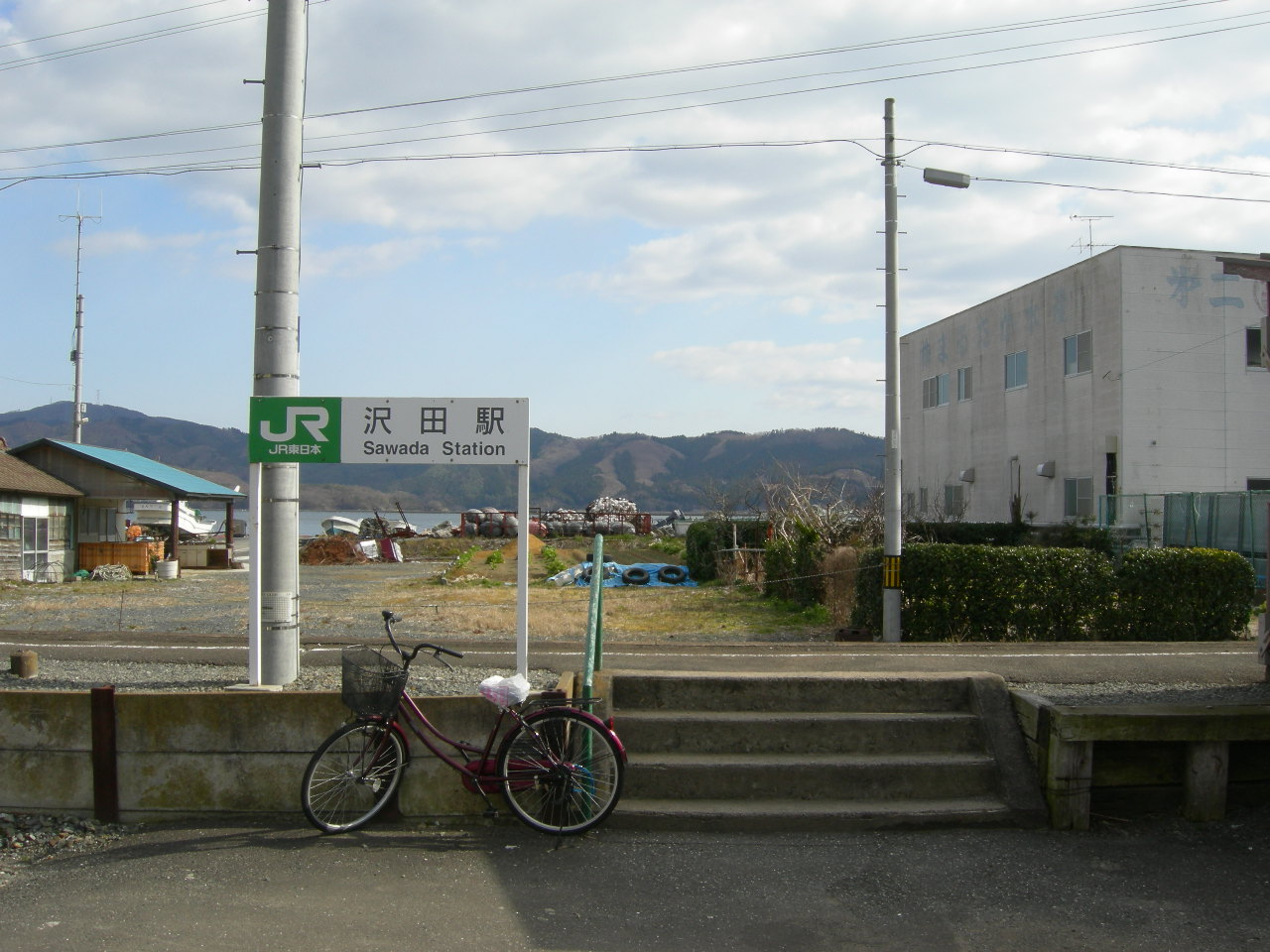
- Sawada Station in February 2007

General information
- Location: 1714 Sawada, Ishinomaki-shi, Miyagi-ken 986-2102; Japan
- Coordinates: 38°25′56″N 141°22′56″E
- Operator: JR East
- Line: ■ Ishinomaki Line
- Distance: 38.3 km from Kogota
- Platforms: 1 side platform
- Tracks: 1

Construction
- Structure type: At grade

Other information
- Status: Unstaffed
- Website: Official website

History
- Opened: October 7, 1939

Services
| Preceding station | JR East | Following station |
|---|---|---|
| Mangokuura towards Kogota | Ishinomaki Line | Urashuku towards Onagawa |
| Mangokuura towards Sendai | Senseki-Tōhoku Line Rapid | Urashuku towards Onagawa |
Location
- Location within Miyagi Prefecture Location within Japan

Sawada Station (沢田駅, Sawada eki) is a railway station in the city of Ishinomaki, Miyagi Prefecture, Japan, operated by East Japan Railway Company (JR East).

== Lines ==
Sawada Station is served by the Ishinomaki Line, and is located 38.3 kilometers from the terminus of the line at Kogota Station.

== Station layout ==
The station has one side platform, serving a single bi-directional track. The station is unattended and there is no station building.

== History ==
Sawada Station opened on October 7, 1939. The station was absorbed into the JR East network upon the privatization of Japanese National Railways (JNR) on April 1, 1987. Operations of the line and the station were suspended by the 2011 Tōhoku earthquake and tsunami of March 11, 2011. Services were resumed on March 16, 2013; but remained suspended on the portion from Urashuku to Onagawa until August 6, 2016.

== Adjacent stations ==
JR East
■Ishinomaki Line・■■Senseki-Tohoku Line

■Rapid・■Local

Mangokuura - Sta.Sawada - Urashuku

== Surrounding area ==
- National Route 398
- Mangokuura Port

== See also ==
- List of railway stations in Japan
