= Kanomata Station =

Railway station in Ishinomaki, Miyagi Prefecture, Japan

Kanomata Station 鹿又駅
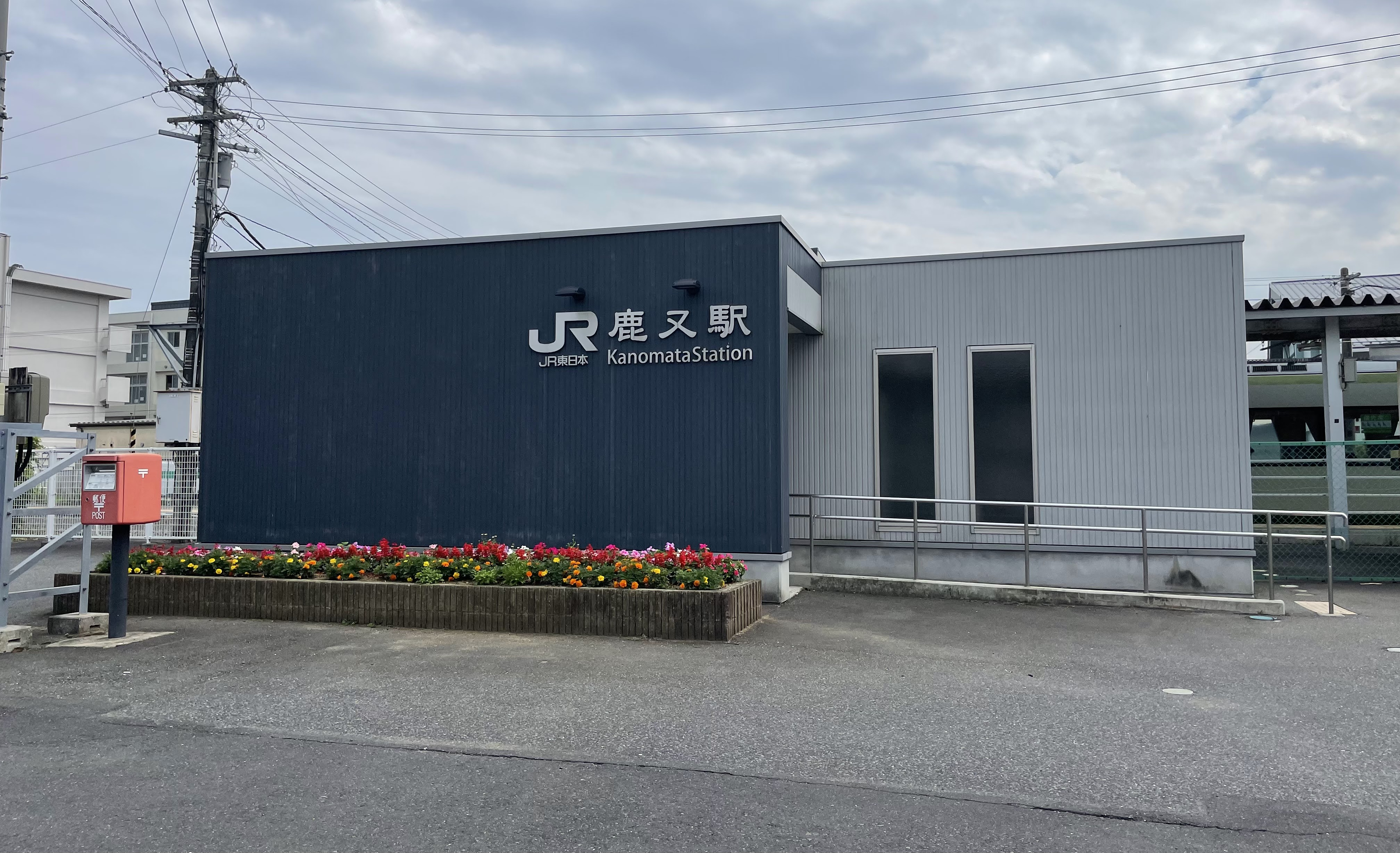
- Kanomata Station in July, 2022

General information
- Location: Kanomata Shinden-cho-ura 84, Ishinomaki-shi, Miyagi-ken 986-1111; Japan
- Coordinates: 38°29′09″N 141°17′00″E
- Operator: JR East
- Line: ■ Ishinomaki Line
- Distance: 21.2 km from Kogota
- Platforms: 2 side platforms
- Tracks: 2

Construction
- Structure type: At grade

Other information
- Status: Unstaffed
- Website: Official website

History
- Opened: August 26, 1989

Services
Preceding station	JR East	Following station
Kakeyama towards Kogota	Ishinomaki Line	Sobanokami towards Onagawa
Location
- Location within Miyagi Prefecture Location within Japan

Kanomata Station (鹿又駅, Kanomata-eki) is a railway station located in the city of Ishinomaki, Miyagi Prefecture, Japan, operated by East Japan Railway Company (JR East).

== Lines ==
Kanomata Station is served by the Ishinomaki Line, and is located 21.2 kilometers from the terminus of the line at Kogota Station.

== Station layout ==
The station has two opposed side platforms, connected to the station building by a footbridge. The station is unattended.

=== Platforms ===
1	■ Ishinomaki Line	for Ishinomaki and Onagawa
2	■ Ishinomaki Line	for Kogota

== History ==
Kanomata Station opened on October 28, 1912. The station was absorbed into the JR East network upon the privatization of Japanese National Railways (JNR) on April 1, 1987. Operations of the line and the station were suspended by the 2011 Tōhoku earthquake and tsunami of March 11, 2011. Services were resumed on March 17, 2013.

== Surrounding area ==
- National Route 45
- Miyagi Prefectural Kannan High School
- Kanomata Post Office

== See also ==
- List of railway stations in Japan
