= Kakeyama Station =

Railway station in Ishinomaki, Miyagi Prefecture, Japan

Kakeyama Station 佳景山駅
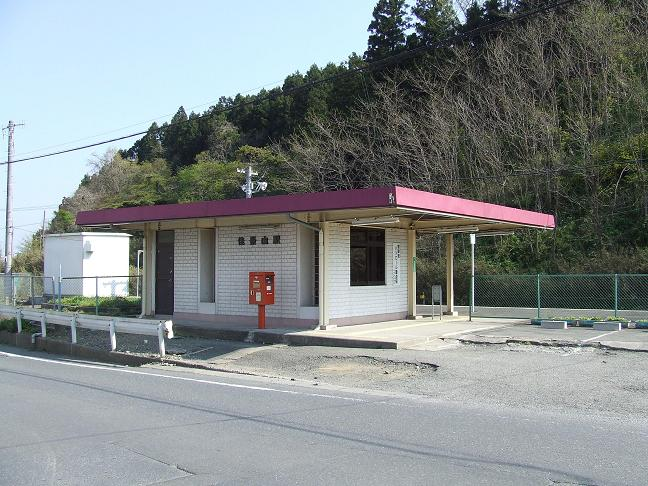
- Kakeyama Station in April 2009

General information
- Location: 4 Kanomata Kakeyama Ishinomaki-shi, Miyagi-ken 986-1111; Japan
- Coordinates: 38°29′53″N 141°14′23″E
- Operator: JR East
- Line: ■ Ishinomaki Line
- Distance: 17.1 km from Kogota
- Platforms: 1 side platform
- Tracks: 1

Construction
- Structure type: At grade

Other information
- Status: Unstaffed
- Website: Official website

History
- Opened: October 28, 1912

Services
Preceding station	JR East	Following station
Maeyachi towards Kogota	Ishinomaki Line	Kanomata towards Onagawa
Location
- Location within Miyagi Prefecture Location within Japan

Kakeyama Station (佳景山駅, Kakeyama-eki) is a railway station located in the city of Ishinomaki, Miyagi Prefecture, Japan, operated by East Japan Railway Company (JR East).

== Lines ==
Kakeyama Station is served by the Ishinomaki Line, and is located 17.1 kilometers from the terminus of the line at Kogota Station.

== Station layout ==
The station has one side platform serving a single bi-directional track. The station is unattended.

== History ==
Kakeyama Station opened on October 28, 1912. The station was absorbed into the JR East network upon the privatization of Japanese National Railways (JNR) on April 1, 1987. Operations of the line and the station were suspended by the 2011 Tōhoku earthquake and tsunami of March 11, 2011. Services were resumed on March 17, 2013.

== Surrounding area ==
- Ishinomaki City East Kannan Junior High School
- Miyagi Prefectural Highway 257

== See also ==
- List of railway stations in Japan
