= Wakuya Station =

Railway station in Wakuya, Miyagi Prefecture, Japan

Wakuya Station 涌谷駅
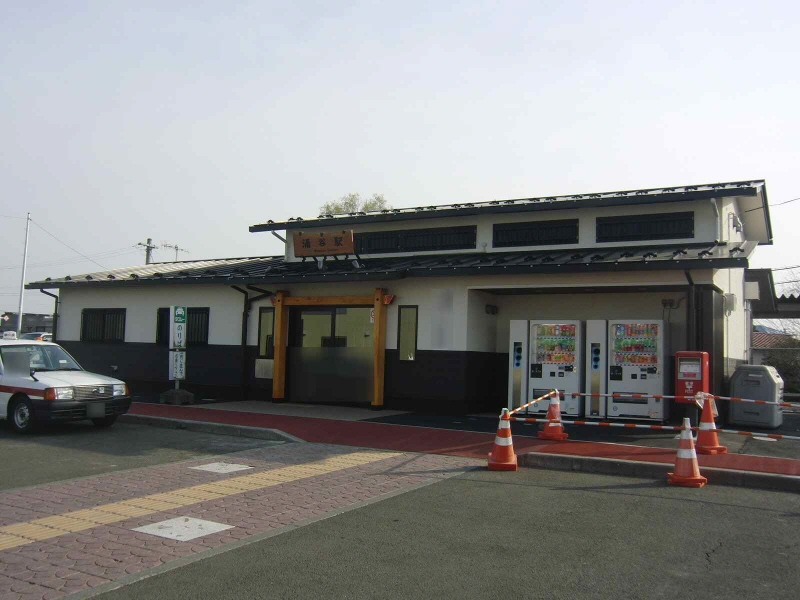
- Wakuya Station, April 2013

General information
- Location: Shinmachi-ura 124, Wakuya-machi, Tōda-gun Miyagi-ken 987-0114; Japan
- Coordinates: 38°32′17″N 141°07′38″E
- Operator: JR East
- Line: ■ Ishinomaki Line
- Distance: 6.2 km from Kogota
- Platforms: 1 island platform
- Tracks: 2

Construction
- Structure type: At grade

Other information
- Status: Staffed
- Website: Official website

History
- Opened: October 28, 1912
- Rebuilt: 2013

Passengers
- FY2018: 559

Services
| Preceding station | JR East | Following station |
|---|---|---|
| Kami-Wakuya towards Kogota | Ishinomaki Line | Maeyachi towards Onagawa |
| Kami-Wakuya towards Kogota | Kesennuma Line | Maeyachi towards Yanaizu |
Location
- Location within Miyagi Prefecture Location within Japan

Wakuya Station (涌谷駅, Wakuya-eki) is a railway station in the town of Wakuya, Miyagi Prefecture, Japan, operated by East Japan Railway Company (JR East).

== Lines ==
Wakuya Station is served by the Ishinomaki Line, and is located 6.2 rail kilometers from the terminus of the line at Kogota Station.

== Station layout ==
The station has two opposed ground-level side platforms connected to the station building by a footbridge. The station is staffed.

=== Platforms ===
| 1 | ■ Ishinomaki Line | for Ishinomaki and Onagawa |
| 2 | ■ Ishinomaki Line | for Kogota |

== History ==
Wakuya Station opened on October 28, 1912. The station was absorbed into the JR East network upon the privatization of JNR on April 1, 1987. A new station building was completed in May 2013.

== Passenger statistics ==
In fiscal year 2018, the station was used by an average of 559 passengers daily (boarding passengers only).

== Surrounding area ==
- Wakuya Town Hall
- Wakuya Post Office
- National Route 108
- National Route 346
- Shiroyama Castle Site

== See also ==
- List of railway stations in Japan
