= Urashuku Station =

Railway station in Onagawa, Miyagi Prefecture, Japan

Urashuku Station 浦宿駅
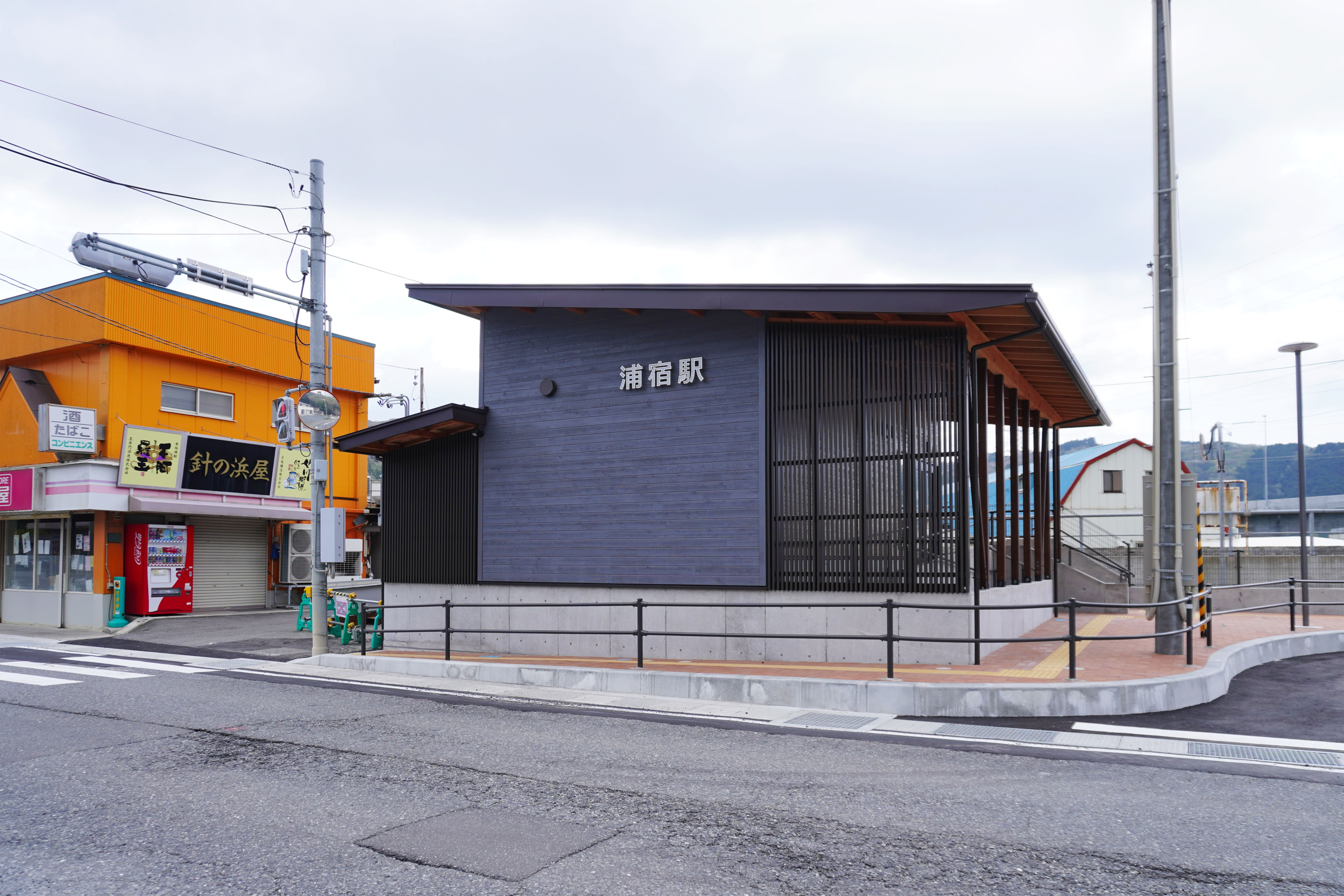
- Urashuku Station in April 2024

General information
- Location: Urashukuhama Urashuku, Onagawa-machi, Oshika-gun, Miyagi-ken 986-2231; Japan
- Coordinates: 38°26′11″N 141°25′17″E
- Operator: JR East
- Line: Ishinomaki Line
- Distance: 37.0 km (23.0 mi) from Kogota
- Platforms: 1 side platform
- Tracks: 1

Construction
- Structure type: At grade

Other information
- Status: Unstaffed
- Website: Official website

History
- Opened: 12 February 1956; 70 years ago

Services
Preceding station	JR East	Following station
Sawada towards Kogota	Ishinomaki Line	Onagawa Terminus
Sawada towards Sendai	Senseki-Tōhoku Line Rapid	Onagawa Terminus
Location
- Location within Miyagi Prefecture Location within Tohoku, Japan Location within Japan

Urashuku Station (浦宿駅, Urashuku-eki) is a railway station in the town of Onagawa, Miyagi Prefecture, Japan, operated by East Japan Railway Company (JR East).

== Lines ==
Urashuku Station is served by the Ishinomaki Line, and is located 37.0 kilometers from the terminus of the line at Kogota Station. From the 2011 Tōhoku earthquake and tsunami of March 11, 2011 until March 21, 2015, services past Urashuku were suspended, making Urashuku Station the effective terminus of the line.

== Station layout ==
The station has one side platform, serving traffic in both directions. The station is unattended.

== History ==
Urashuku Station opened on February 12, 1956. The station was absorbed into the JR East network upon the privatization of JNR on April 1, 1987. Operations of the line and the station were suspended by the 2011 Tōhoku earthquake and tsunami of March 11, 2011. Services were resumed on March 16, 2013; but remained suspended on the portion from Urashuku to Onagawa until services resumed on March 21, 2015.

== Surrounding area ==
- National Route 398
- Mangoku-Ura lake

== Gallery ==
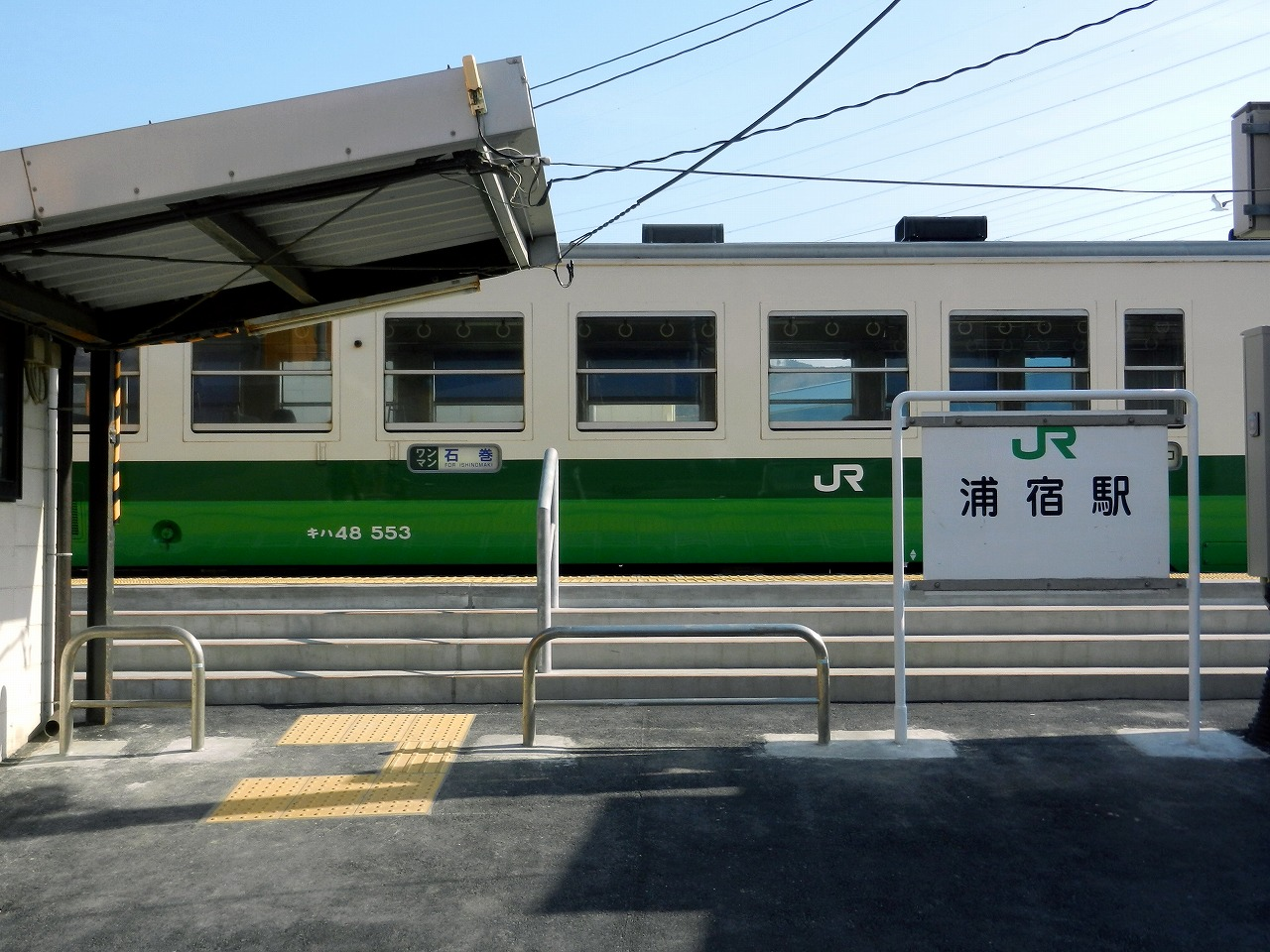
A Local Ishinomaki Line train headed towards Ishinomaki

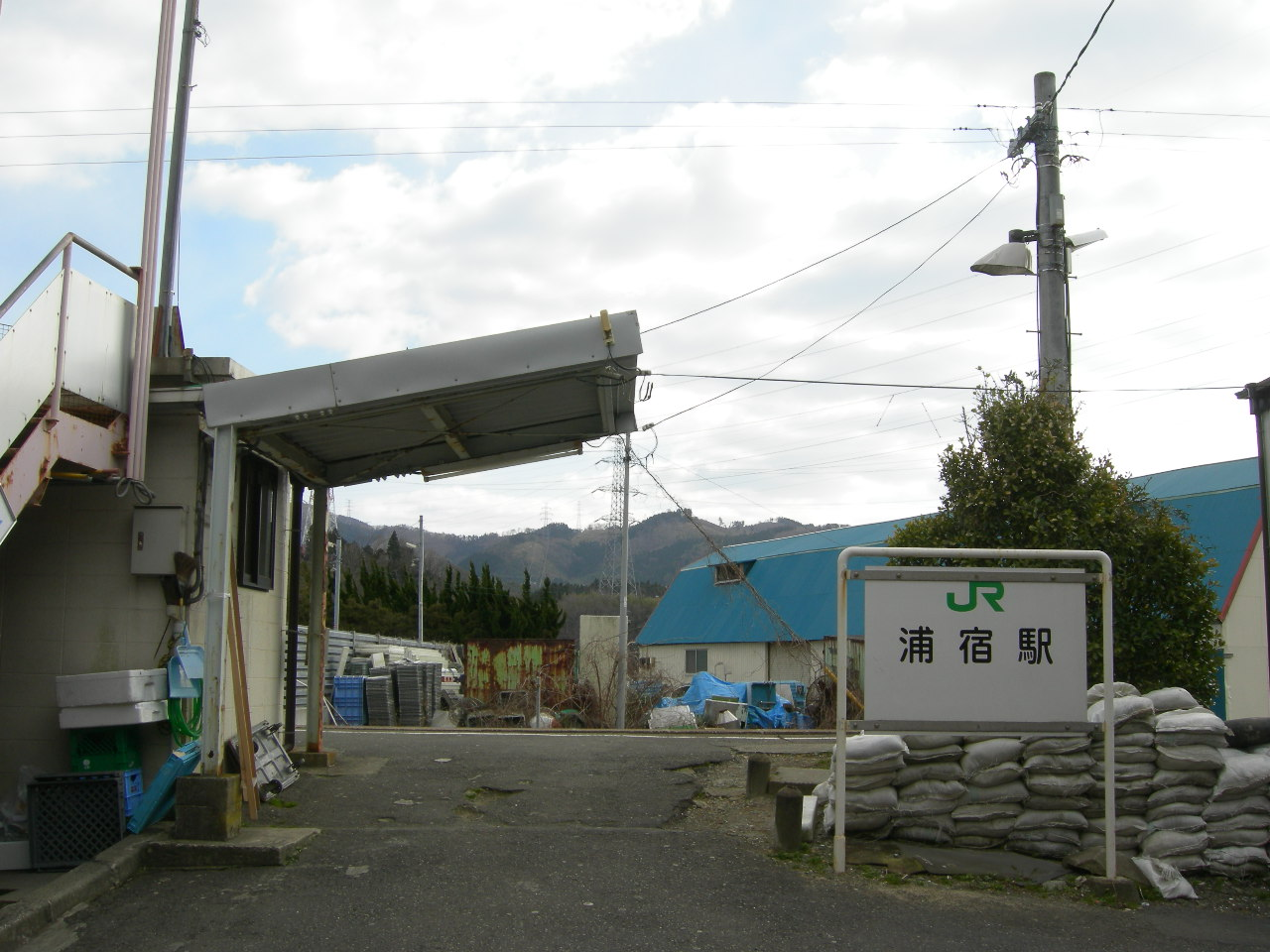
Old station structure with barrier-free access in February 2007, before the 2011 Tōhoku earthquake and tsunami

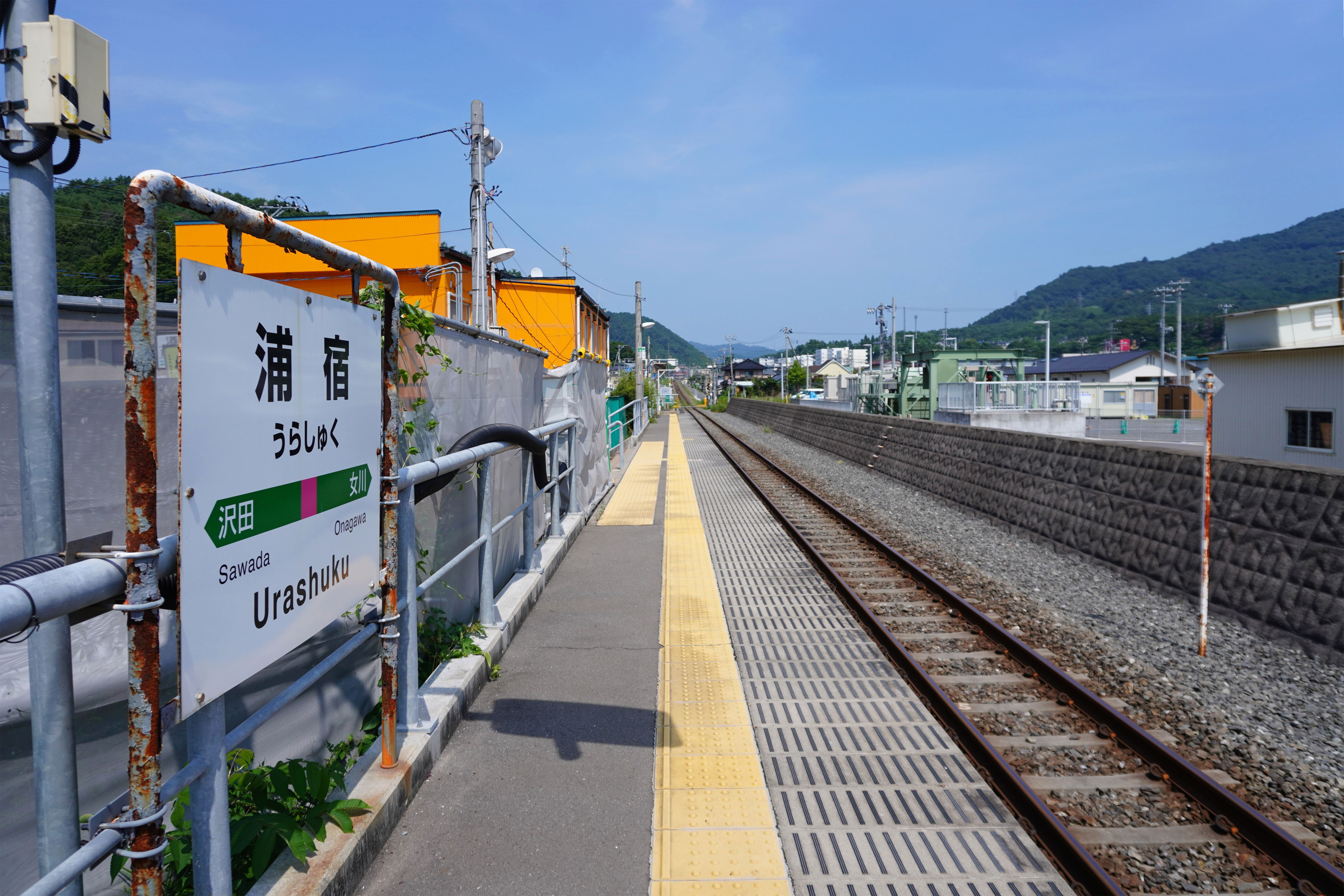
Platform

== See also ==
- List of railway stations in Japan
