= Kami-Wakuya Station =

Railway station in Wakuya, Miyagi Prefecture, Japan

Kami-Wakuya Station 上涌谷駅
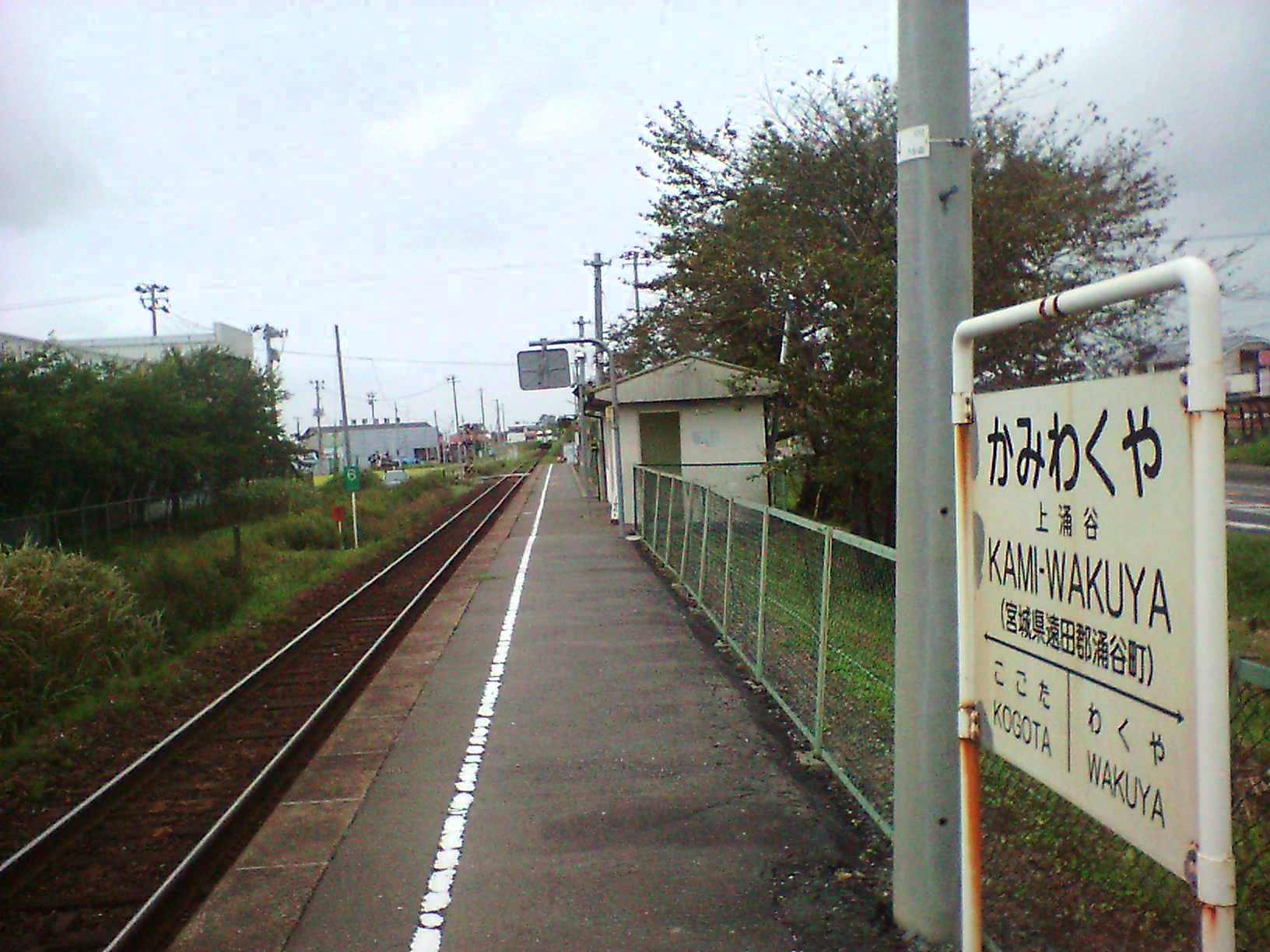
- Kami-Wakuya Station, September 2005

General information
- Location: Kamon Okina, Wakuya-machi, Tōda-gun, Miyagi-ken 987-0133; Japan
- Coordinates: 38°32′56.91″N 141°5′59.14″E
- Operator: JR East
- Line: ■ Ishinomaki Line
- Distance: 3.6 km from Kogota
- Platforms: 1 side platform
- Tracks: 1

Construction
- Structure type: At grade

Other information
- Status: Unstaffed
- Website: Official website

History
- Opened: August 1, 1957

Services
Preceding station	JR East	Following station
Kogota Terminus	Ishinomaki Line	Wakuya towards Onagawa
Kogota Terminus	Kesennuma Line	Wakuya towards Yanaizu
Location
- Location within Miyagi Prefecture Location within Japan

Kami-Wakuya Station (上涌谷駅, Kami-Wakuya-eki) is a railway station in the town of Wakuya, Miyagi Prefecture, Japan, operated by East Japan Railway Company (JR East).

== Lines ==
Kami-Wakuya Station is served by the Ishinomaki Line, and is located 3.6 rail kilometers from the terminus of the line at Kogota Station.

== Station layout ==
The station has one side platform serving a single bi-directional track. The station is unattended.

== History ==
Kami-Wakuya Station opened on August 1, 1957. The station was absorbed into the JR East network upon the privatization of JNR on April 1, 1987.

== Surrounding area ==
- National Route 108

== See also ==
- List of railway stations in Japan
