= Sobanokami Station =

Railway station in Ishinomaki, Miyagi Prefecture, Japan

Sobanokami Station 曽波神駅
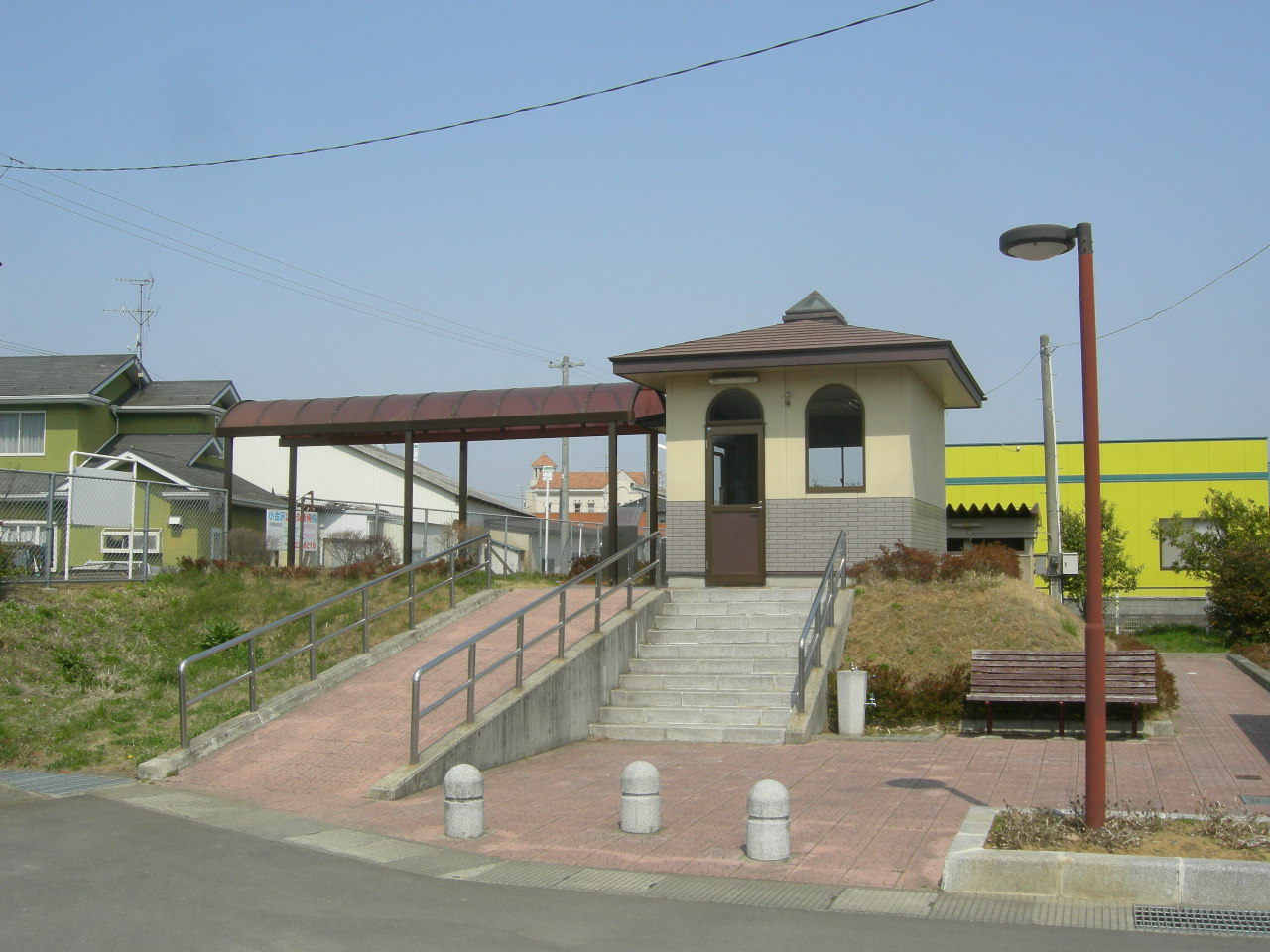
- Sobanokami Station in April 2008

General information
- Location: Kanomata Sobanokami-mae 239, Ishinomaki-shi, Miyagi-ken 986-1111; Japan
- Coordinates: 38°27′57″N 141°17′16″E
- Operator: JR East
- Line: ■ Ishinomaki Line
- Distance: 23.7 km from Kogota
- Platforms: 1 side platform
- Tracks: 1

Construction
- Structure type: At grade

Other information
- Status: Unstaffed
- Website: Official website

History
- Opened: April 5, 1956

Services
Preceding station	JR East	Following station
Kanomata towards Kogota	Ishinomaki Line	Ishinomaki towards Onagawa
Location
- Location within Miyagi Prefecture Location within Japan

Sobanokami Station (曽波神駅, Sobanokami-eki) is a railway station located in the city of Ishinomaki, Miyagi Prefecture, Japan, operated by East Japan Railway Company (JR East).

== Lines ==
Sobanokami Station is served by the Ishinomaki Line, and is located 23.7 kilometers from the terminus of the line at Kogota Station.

== Station layout ==
The station has one side platform, serving a single bi-directional track. The station is unattended.

== History ==
Sobanokami Station opened on April 5, 1956. The station was absorbed into the JR East network upon the privatization of JNR on April 1, 1987. Operations of the line and the station were suspended by the 2011 Tōhoku earthquake and tsunami of March 11, 2011. Services were resumed on March 17, 2013.

== Surrounding area ==
- National Route 45

== See also ==
- List of railway stations in Japan
