= Onagawa, Miyagi =

Onagawa 女川町
- Town
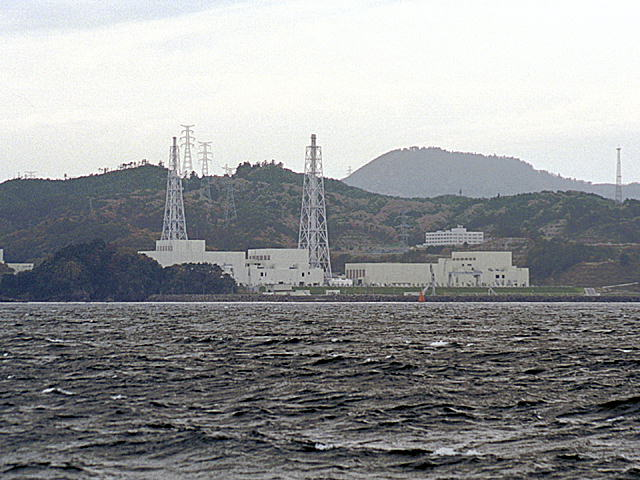
- Onagawa Nuclear Power Plant

- Flag Seal

- Location of Onagawa in Miyagi Prefecture

- Coordinates: 38°26′58.4″N 141°26′33.5″E
- Country: Japan
- Region: Tōhoku
- Prefecture: Miyagi
- District: Oshika

Government
  - Mayor: Yoshiaki Suda

Area
  - Total: 65.35 km^{2} (25.23 sq mi)

Population (October 10, 2020)
  - Total: 6,430
  - Density: 98.4/km^{2} (255/sq mi)
- Time zone: UTC+9 (Japan Standard Time)
- Phone number: 0225-54-3131
- Address: 136-banchi Onagawa Onagawahama, Onagawa-chō, Oshika-gun, Miyagi-ken 986-2292
- Climate: Cfa
- Website: Official website
- Symbols
- Bird: Black-tailed gull
- Fish: Skipjack tuna
- Flower: Sakura
- Tree: Cryptomeria

Onagawa (女川町, Onagawa-chō) is a town located in Miyagi Prefecture, Japan. As of 30 April 2020, the town had an estimated population of 6,319, and a population density of 97 persons per km^{2} in 3,110 households. The total area of the town is 65.35 square kilometres (25.23 sq mi).

== Geography ==
Onagawa is located on the rugged Sanriku Coast of north-central Miyagi Prefecture, with the Kitakami Mountains to the west and the city of Ishinomaki to the east, south and north. Much of the town is within the borders of the Sanriku Fukkō National Park. Onagawa is a natural deep water port, located at the intersection of two major ocean currents and noted for its commercial fishing industry. Located nearby on the southern side of Onagawa Bay is the Onagawa Nuclear Power Plant.

=== Neighboring municipalities ===
Miyagi Prefecture

- Ishinomaki

=== Climate ===
Onagawa has a humid subtropical climate (abbreviated Cfa) closely bordering on a temperate oceanic climate (abbreviated Cfb), characterized by mild summers and cool to cold winters with heavy snowfall. The average annual temperature in Onagawa is 11.1 °C. The average annual rainfall is 1213 mm with September as the wettest month. The temperatures are highest on average in August, at around 23.6 °C, and lowest in January, at around -0.1 °C.

Climate data for Onagawa (2011−2020 normals, extremes 2011−present)
Month	Jan	Feb	Mar	Apr	May	Jun	Jul	Aug	Sep	Oct	Nov	Dec	Year
Record high °C (°F)	12.7 (54.9)	17.2 (63.0)	21.5 (70.7)	27.9 (82.2)	31.4 (88.5)	32.5 (90.5)	34.9 (94.8)	36.9 (98.4)	35.8 (96.4)	27.6 (81.7)	23.0 (73.4)	17.3 (63.1)	36.9 (98.4)
Mean daily maximum °C (°F)	4.9 (40.8)	5.6 (42.1)	10.0 (50.0)	14.6 (58.3)	20.1 (68.2)	22.7 (72.9)	26.3 (79.3)	28.0 (82.4)	24.6 (76.3)	19.2 (66.6)	13.5 (56.3)	7.4 (45.3)	16.4 (61.5)
Daily mean °C (°F)	0.9 (33.6)	1.2 (34.2)	4.9 (40.8)	9.4 (48.9)	14.8 (58.6)	18.0 (64.4)	21.8 (71.2)	23.5 (74.3)	20.3 (68.5)	14.5 (58.1)	8.7 (47.7)	3.1 (37.6)	11.8 (53.2)
Mean daily minimum °C (°F)	−2.9 (26.8)	−2.8 (27.0)	0.1 (32.2)	4.4 (39.9)	9.9 (49.8)	14.2 (57.6)	18.7 (65.7)	20.3 (68.5)	16.8 (62.2)	10.2 (50.4)	4.1 (39.4)	−0.9 (30.4)	7.7 (45.8)
Record low °C (°F)	−9.0 (15.8)	−10.5 (13.1)	−5.6 (21.9)	−2.3 (27.9)	1.9 (35.4)	6.5 (43.7)	13.2 (55.8)	12.4 (54.3)	6.0 (42.8)	2.2 (36.0)	−4.1 (24.6)	−6.9 (19.6)	−10.5 (13.1)
Average precipitation mm (inches)	54.6 (2.15)	38.3 (1.51)	98.6 (3.88)	125.7 (4.95)	119.7 (4.71)	145.2 (5.72)	130.9 (5.15)	142.5 (5.61)	234.1 (9.22)	220.6 (8.69)	57.4 (2.26)	62.3 (2.45)	1,432.5 (56.40)
Average precipitation days (≥ 1.0 mm)	5.1	6.3	7.1	8.7	9.1	9.7	11.4	10.9	10.7	9.3	6.2	6.2	100.7
Source: Japan Meteorological Agency

Climate data for Enoshima, Onagawa (1991−2020 normals, extremes 1978−present)
Month	Jan	Feb	Mar	Apr	May	Jun	Jul	Aug	Sep	Oct	Nov	Dec	Year
Record high °C (°F)	14.8 (58.6)	16.6 (61.9)	19.9 (67.8)	25.0 (77.0)	28.2 (82.8)	29.9 (85.8)	33.1 (91.6)	34.5 (94.1)	31.6 (88.9)	27.7 (81.9)	22.6 (72.7)	19.6 (67.3)	34.5 (94.1)
Mean daily maximum °C (°F)	5.9 (42.6)	6.4 (43.5)	9.2 (48.6)	13.6 (56.5)	17.4 (63.3)	20.5 (68.9)	23.9 (75.0)	26.0 (78.8)	23.7 (74.7)	19.2 (66.6)	14.0 (57.2)	8.7 (47.7)	15.7 (60.3)
Daily mean °C (°F)	2.9 (37.2)	3.0 (37.4)	5.3 (41.5)	9.3 (48.7)	13.3 (55.9)	16.8 (62.2)	20.5 (68.9)	22.5 (72.5)	20.5 (68.9)	16.1 (61.0)	10.9 (51.6)	5.7 (42.3)	12.2 (54.0)
Mean daily minimum °C (°F)	0.4 (32.7)	0.2 (32.4)	2.3 (36.1)	6.1 (43.0)	10.3 (50.5)	14.1 (57.4)	18.1 (64.6)	20.3 (68.5)	18.4 (65.1)	13.7 (56.7)	8.1 (46.6)	3.0 (37.4)	9.6 (49.2)
Record low °C (°F)	−6.6 (20.1)	−7.5 (18.5)	−3.9 (25.0)	−1.1 (30.0)	2.5 (36.5)	7.4 (45.3)	10.9 (51.6)	15.1 (59.2)	10.8 (51.4)	4.7 (40.5)	−1.2 (29.8)	−6.1 (21.0)	−7.5 (18.5)
Average precipitation mm (inches)	46.8 (1.84)	39.1 (1.54)	88.0 (3.46)	98.5 (3.88)	111.4 (4.39)	122.3 (4.81)	153.1 (6.03)	124.7 (4.91)	163.9 (6.45)	145.4 (5.72)	72.5 (2.85)	54.4 (2.14)	1,206.3 (47.49)
Average precipitation days (≥ 1.0 mm)	5.4	6.0	8.5	9.3	9.9	10.7	12.4	10.1	11.1	9.2	6.3	5.9	104.8
Mean monthly sunshine hours	180.3	178.9	193.7	198.1	195.5	161.4	146.3	171.9	147.7	160.2	163.0	162.2	2,058.6
Source: Japan Meteorological Agency

== Demographics ==
Per Japanese census data, the population of Onagawa has declined rapidly over the past 60 years.

Historical population
Year	Pop.	±%
1920	7,490	—
1930	9,690	+29.4%
1940	11,365	+17.3%
1950	16,475	+45.0%
1960	18,002	+9.3%
1970	17,681	−1.8%
1980	16,105	−8.9%
1990	14,018	−13.0%
2000	11,814	−15.7%
2010	10,051	−14.9%
2020	6,430	−36.0%

== History ==
The area of present-day Onagawa was part of ancient Mutsu Province, and has been settled since at least the Jōmon period by the Emishi people. During later portion of the Heian period, the area was ruled by the Northern Fujiwara. During the Sengoku period, the area was contested by various samurai clans before the area came under the control of the Date clan of Sendai Domain during the Edo period, under the Tokugawa shogunate.

The village of Onagawa was established on 1 June 1889 with the establishment of the modern municipalities system.

The port of Onagawa, with its deep and sheltered harbor, has long been important both commercially and militarily. The port was hit by an air raid on 9 August 1945, which sank several ships during the closing days of World War II. A memorial to Canadian Royal Navy Fleet Air Arm pilot Robert Hampton Gray who died in the attack, was unveiled in the town in 1989.

Onagawa was raised to town status on 1 April 1956.

=== 2011 earthquake and tsunami ===
Onagawa was one of the most heavily damaged communities by the 11 March 2011 Tōhoku earthquake and tsunami. The tsunami reached in excess of 15 metres (49 ft) in height and swept 1 kilometre (0.62 mi) inland, claiming 827 lives and destroying 70% of the buildings in the town. At least 12 of the town's 25 designated evacuation sites were inundated by the tsunami. The town's hospital located on a hill was extensively flooded on the first floor at the maximum recorded wave height of 18 meters. Six reinforced concrete buildings in the town of up to 4 stories in height were overturned by the force of the surging water and debris and Onagawa Station and its nearby railway tracks were also destroyed.

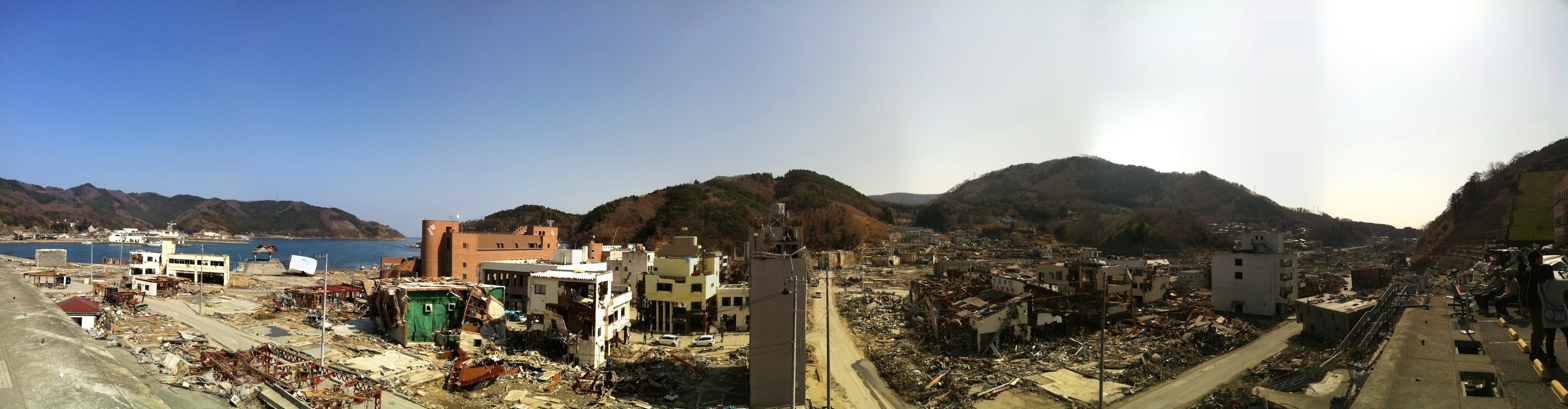
View of Onagawa one month after the tsunami. (10 April 2011)

In an incident widely reported in the Chinese media, Mitsuru Sato, managing director of Sato Suisan, a fish processing company in the town, gave his life ensuring that all the firm's workers, including 20 female Chinese resident trainees, had evacuated safely to higher ground.

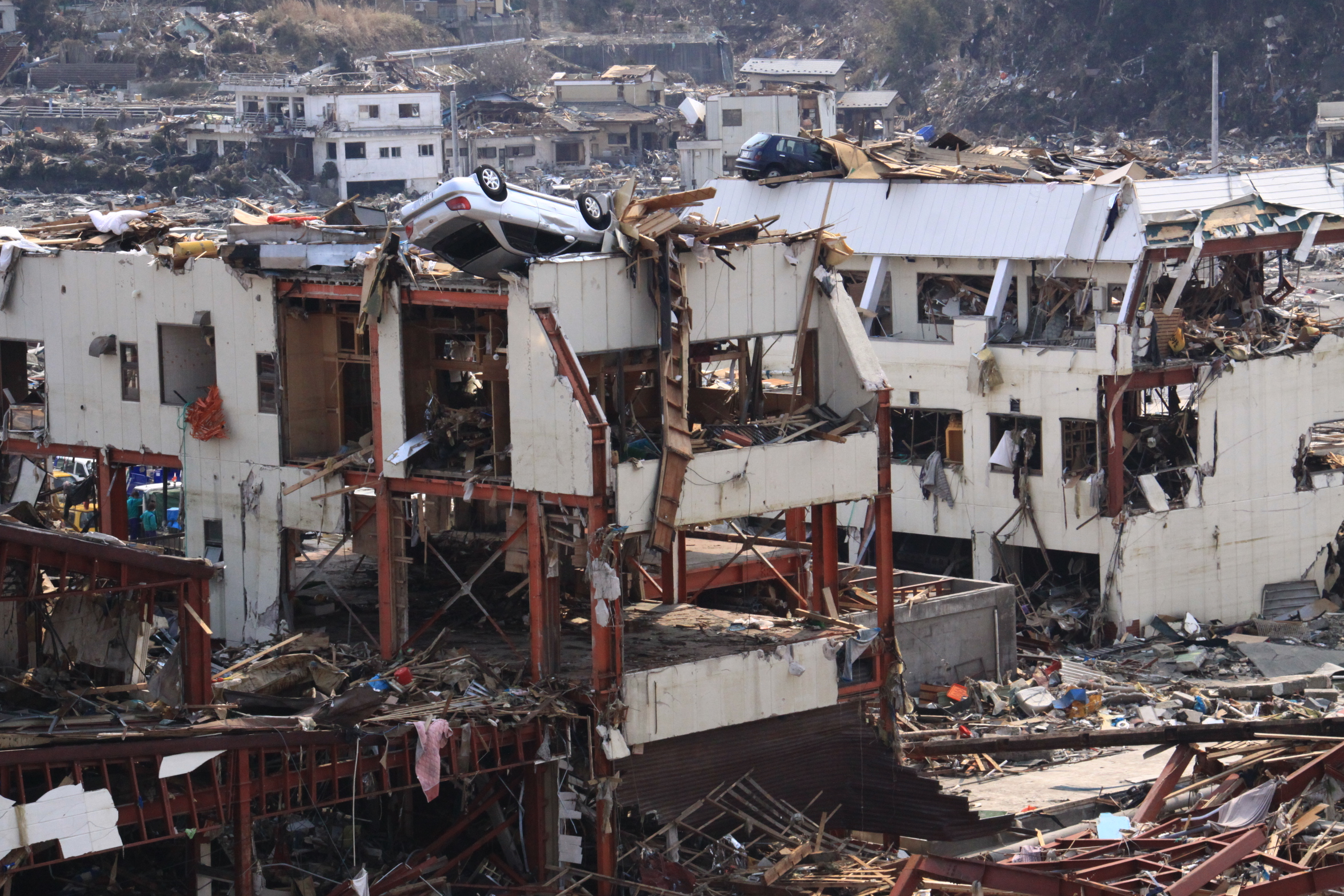
Onagawa after the tsunami

Whereas the Fukushima Daiichi Nuclear Power Plant suffered insufficient cooling in the wake of the tsunami which led to three nuclear meltdowns and the release of radioactive material, the Onagawa nuclear generation facility, much closer to the earthquake epicenter, survived the earthquake without any significant damage and served as an emergency refuge for the local community.

The town had previously been hit by tsunami including that caused by the 1960 Valdivia earthquake, although it had received comparatively less impact from tsunami in the aftermath of the 1896 and 1933 Sanriku earthquakes.

Seismologists note that the deep inlets and bays of the nearby ria coastline have the potential to amplify the destructiveness of tsunami waves. Tsunami mitigation structures, warning systems and evacuation training have long been a feature of the town.

=== Post tsunami reconstruction ===
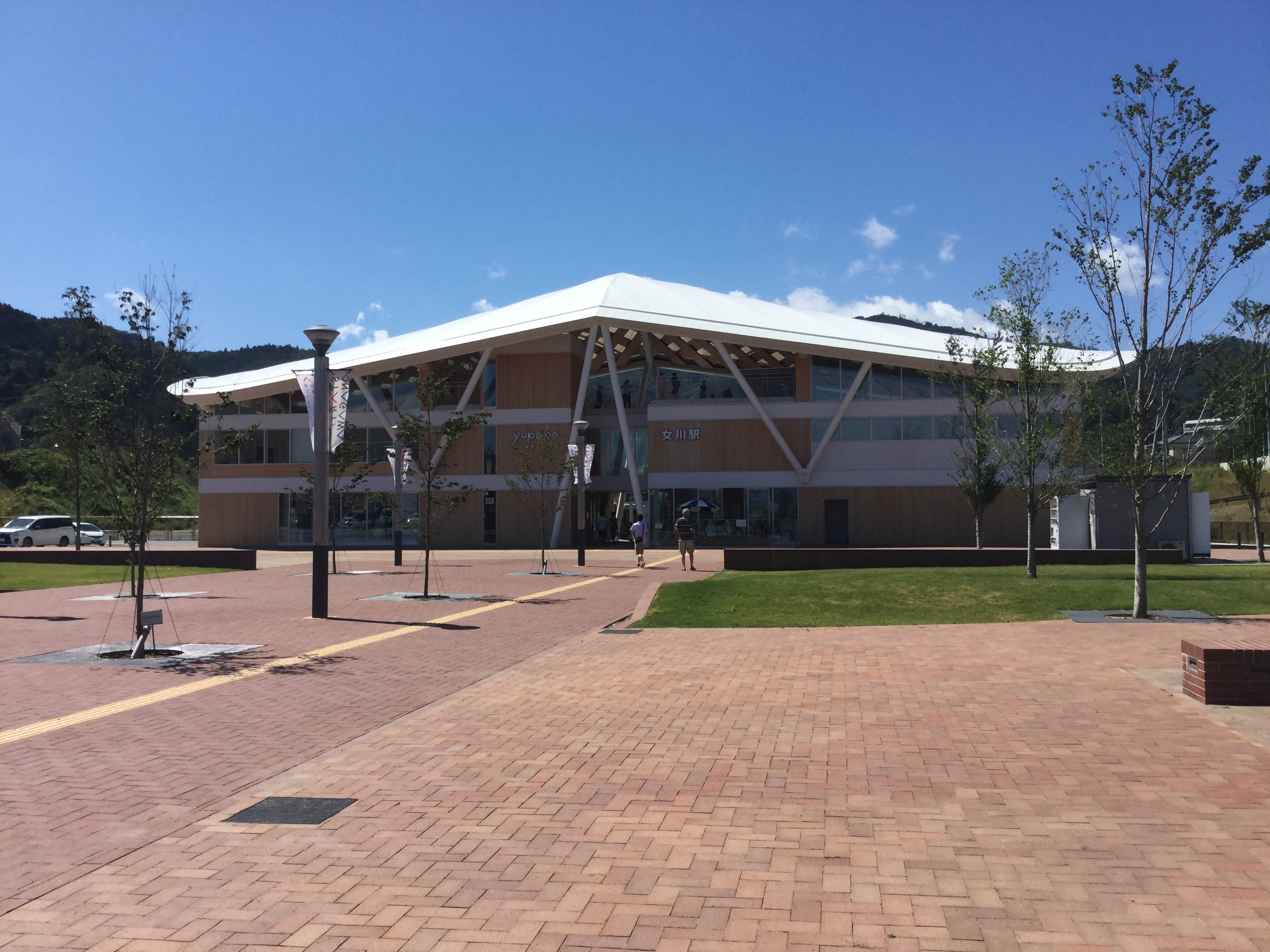
Onagawa Station

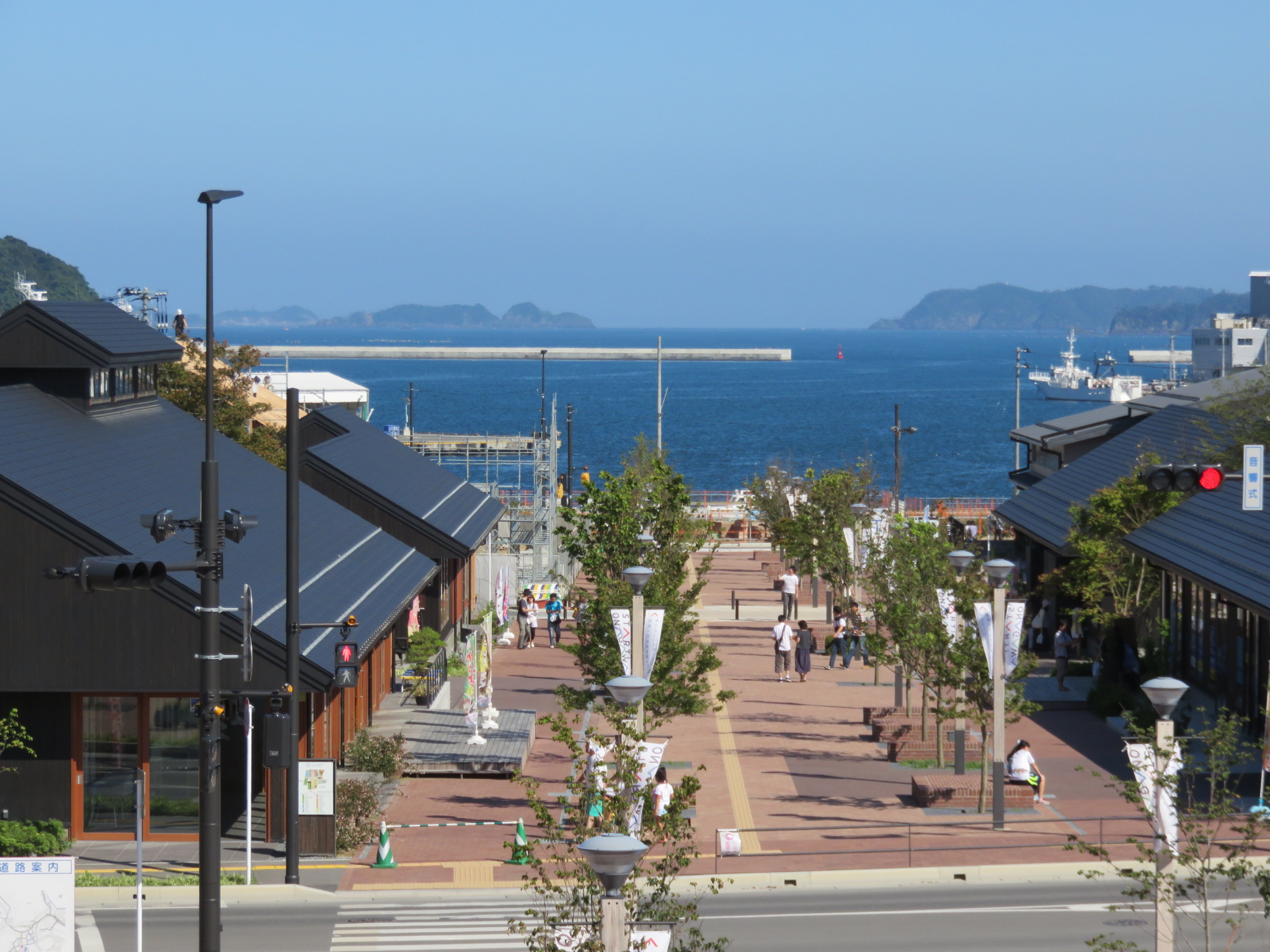
Onagawa Seapal Pia

The local community's reconstruction efforts, in many cases led by Onagawa private sector business leaders, have outpaced many larger towns impacted by the 2011 Tōhoku earthquake and tsunami. Within days of the disaster privately owned construction machinery were used to clear roads, a wholesale fish market was relaunched on 1 April and a reconstruction advisory board was formed shortly thereafter. In the aftermath of the tsunami local residents successfully established small scale grocery stores and retail food facilities in a series of temporary market structures.

Onagawa's reconstruction plans were deliberated and materialized through a variety of participatory governance arrangements.

On 21 March 2015 the reconstructed Onagawa Station reopened marking the restoration of the entire Ishinomaki Line. The new station building features an integrated community center and public bathing facility on the upper floors.

Serving both the needs of the local community and attracting out of town visitors, a pedestrianized shopping promenade called Seapal Pia was opened in December 2015.

Five years after the tsunami many Onagawa residents continue to live in short-term temporary accommodation. After extensive landscaping, new residential housing is being relocated at higher elevations on nearby hillsides and leftover soil is being used to raise industrial and commercial sections closer to the water an average of 4.5 metres (15 ft) above sea level.

Reconstruction has been supported both by central government funding and a number of private individuals and foundations including:

- The Qatar Friendship Fund, which provided US$24 million for the design and construction of a new fish processing and refrigerated storage facility.
- Pritzker Architecture Prize winner Shigeru Ban, and the Voluntary Architects' Network, provided designs both for temporary housing shelters in the town as well as the rebuilt Onagawa Station building.

== Government ==
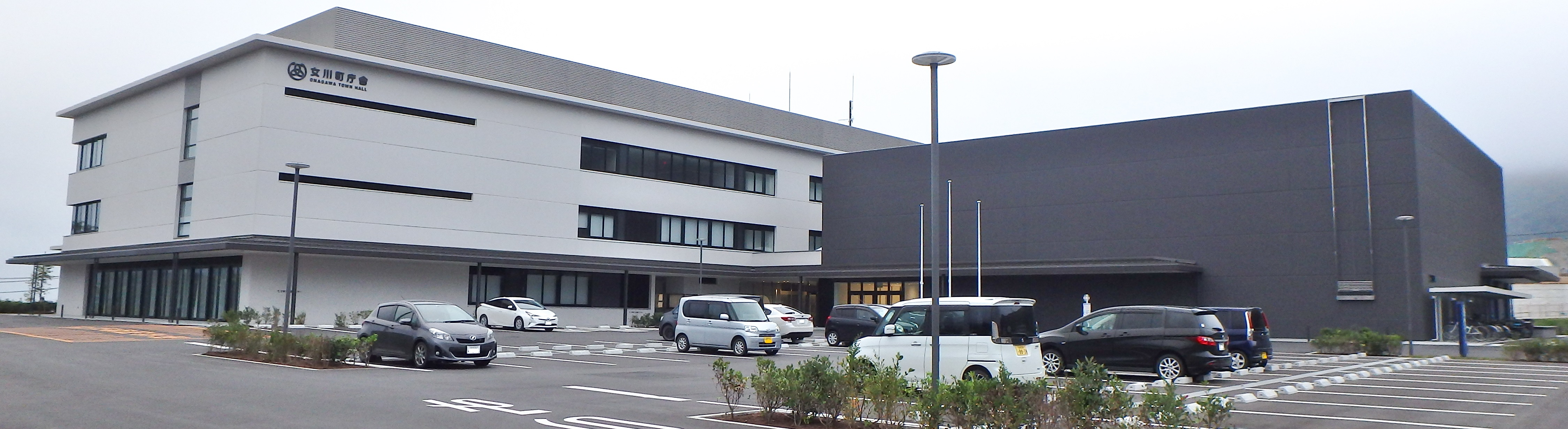
Onagawa Town Hall

Onagawa has a mayor-council form of government with a directly elected mayor and a unicameral town council of 12 members. Onagawa, together with the city of Ishinomaki, contributes five seats to the Miyagi Prefectural legislature. In terms of national politics, the town is part of Miyagi 5th district of the lower house of the Diet of Japan.

== Economy ==
The economy of Onagawa is largely based on commercial fishing. The town acts as a processing and distribution hub for variety of sea foods, but is particularly known for coho salmon, pacific saury and the cultivation of oysters. The Onagawa Nuclear Power Plant, once a major source of income for the town, has remained offline since the 2011 earthquake; an intended restart date for the plant was originally set for 2021, but has been moved to 2024.

== Education ==
Onagawa has one public elementary school and one public junior high school operated by the town government. The town does not have a high school. The old high school (Miyagi Prefecture Onagawa High School ) was closed in 2014 as it only had 47 students.

== Transportation ==
=== Railway ===
==== JR East ====
- ■Ishinomaki Line
  - Urashuku - Onagawa

=== Highway ===
- National Route 398

=== Ferry ===
- Kinkasan Ferry

== Local attractions ==
The town takes pride in the fact that it still has beaches with "squeaking sand", which have become rare in Japan due to human induced environmental changes.

== Notable people from Onagawa ==
- Masatoshi Nakamura, actor
