= Rikuzen-Inai Station =

Railway station in Ishinomaki, Miyagi Prefecture, Japan

Rikuzen-Inai Station 陸前稲井駅
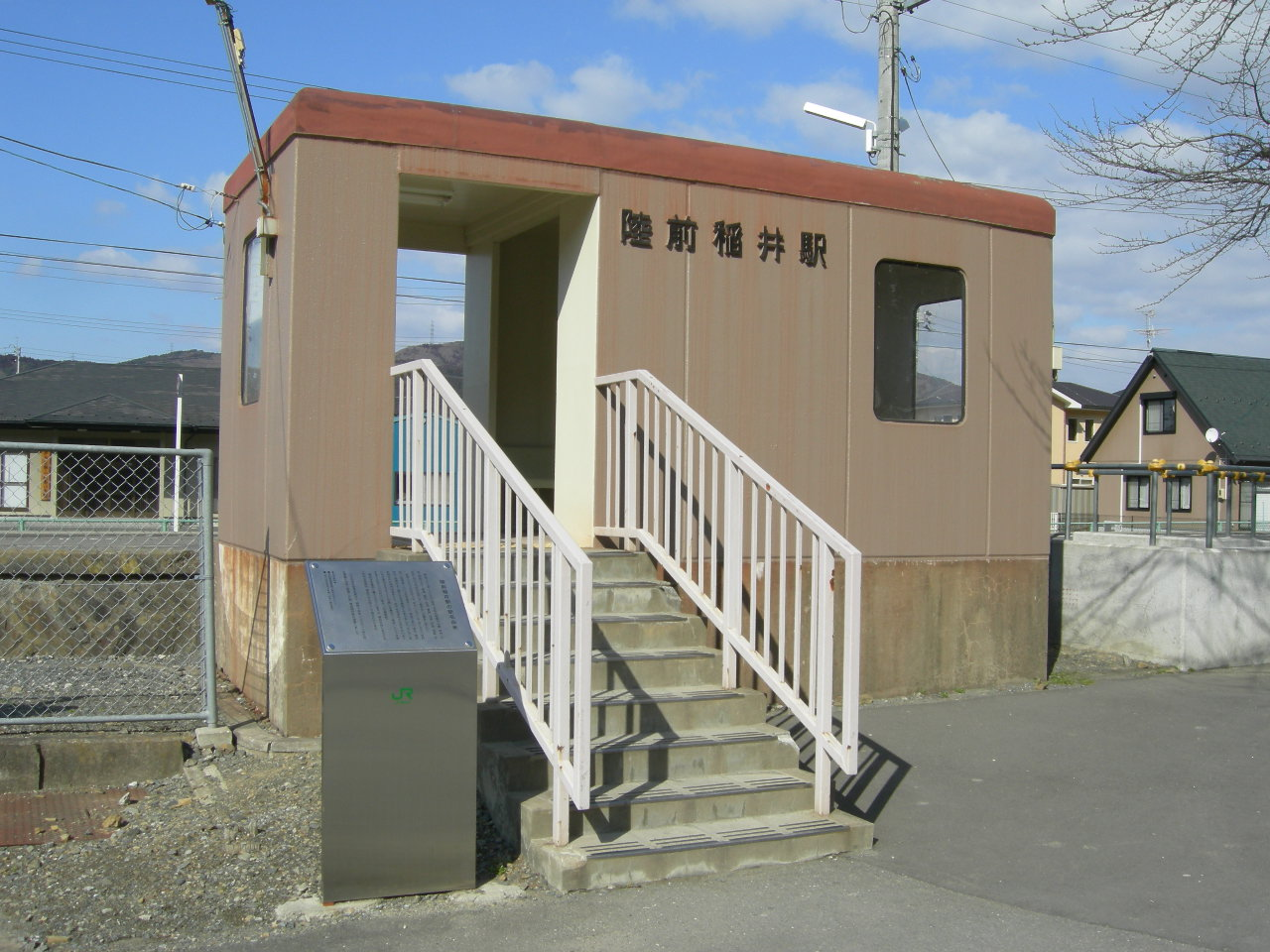
- Rikuzen-Inai Station in February 2007

General information
- Location: 2 Inai Takinokuchi, Ishinomaki-shi, Miyagi-ken 986-0003; Japan
- Coordinates: 38°26′44″N 141°20′06″E
- Operator: JR East
- Lines: ■ Ishinomaki Line; ■ Senseki Line
- Distance: 30.9 km from Kogota
- Platforms: 1 side platform
- Tracks: 1

Construction
- Structure type: At grade

Other information
- Status: Unstaffed
- Website: Official website

History
- Opened: October 7, 1939

Services
Preceding station	JR East	Following station
Ishinomaki towards Kogota	Ishinomaki Line	Watanoha towards Onagawa
Ishinomaki towards Sendai	Senseki-Tōhoku Line Rapid	Watanoha towards Onagawa
Location
- Location within Miyagi Prefecture Location within Japan

Rikuzen-Inai Station (陸前稲井駅, Rikuzen-Inai-eki) is a railway station in the city of Ishinomaki, Miyagi Prefecture, Japan, operated by East Japan Railway Company (JR East).

== Lines ==
Rikuzen-Inai Station is served by the Ishinomaki Line, and is located 30.9 kilometers from the terminus of the line at Kogota Station. The station is also served by local trains of the Senseki-Tōhoku Line, which uses the same track.

== Station layout ==
The station has one side platform, serving traffic on a single bi-directional line. The station is unattended.

== History ==
Rikuzen-Inai Station opened on October 7, 1939. The station was absorbed into the JR East network upon the privatization of JNR on April 1, 1987. Operations of the line and the station were suspended by the 2011 Tōhoku earthquake and tsunami of March 11, 2011. Services were resumed on March 17, 2013 on the Ishinomaki Line, and on August 6, 2016 on the Senseki-Tōhoku Line.

== Surrounding area ==
- Former Inai Town Hall
- Inai Post Office

== See also ==
- List of railway stations in Japan
