= Ishinomaki Line =

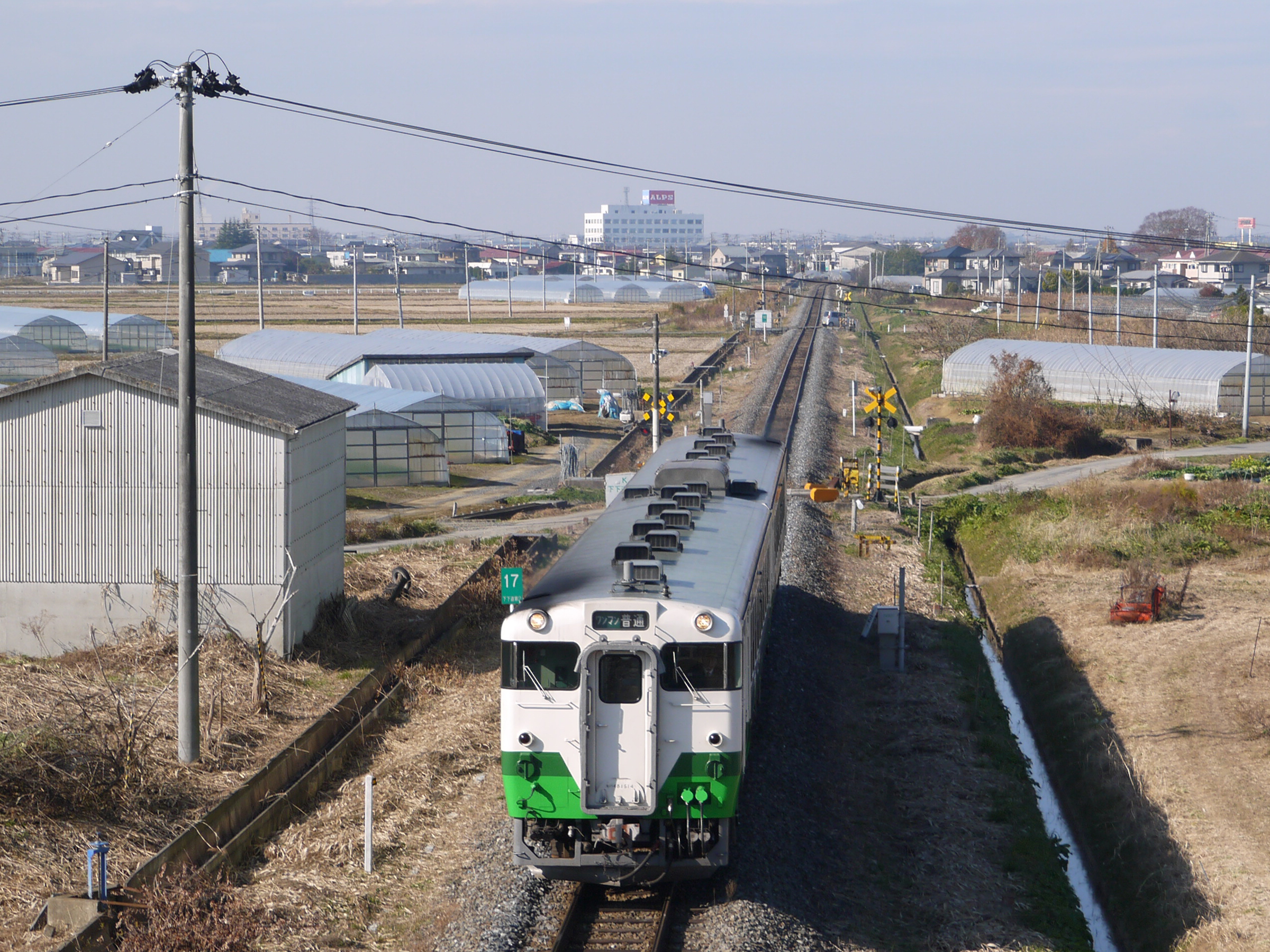
- KiHa 48 DMU on a local service, November 2014

Overview
- Native name: 石巻線
- Status: In operation
- Owner: JR East
- Locale: Miyagi Prefecture
- Termini: Kogota; Onagawa
- Stations: 14

Service
- Type: Regional rail
- Operator(s): JR East
- Rolling stock: KiHa 110 series DMU, HB-E210 series DMU

History
- Opened: 28 October 1912; 113 years ago

Technical
- Line length: 44.7 km (27.8 mi)
- Number of tracks: Entirely single-track
- Character: Urban and rural
- Track gauge: 1,067 mm (3 ft 6 in)
- Electrification: None
- Operating speed: 85 km/h (53 mph)
- Signalling: Automatic closed block
- Train protection system: ATS-SN

The Ishinomaki Line (石巻線, Ishinomaki-sen) is a railway line in Miyagi Prefecture, Japan, operated by East Japan Railway Company (JR East). It connects Kogota Station in Misato with Onagawa Station in Onagawa, acting as a spur line from the Tōhoku Main Line to the central coast of Miyagi Prefecture. It connects with the Rikuu East Line and Tōhoku Main Line at Kogota Station, the Kesennuma Line at Maeyachi Station, and the Senseki Line at Ishinomaki Station, both in Ishinomaki, Miyagi. The line was damaged by the 2011 Tōhoku earthquake and tsunami, and the damage was so severe that service between Urashuku Station and Onagawa Station was not reinstated until 21 March 2015.

== Station list ==
All stations are in Miyagi.

| Station name | Japanese | Distance | Transfers | Location |
|---|---|---|---|---|
| Kogota | 小牛田 | 0.0 | ■ Tōhoku Main Line ■ Rikuu East Line | Misato |
| Kami-Wakuya | 上涌谷 | 3.5 | | Wakuya |
| Wakuya | 涌谷 | 6.2 | | Wakuya |
| Maeyachi | 前谷地 | 12.8 | ■ Kesennuma Line | Ishinomaki |
| Kakeyama | 佳景山 | 17.1 | | Ishinomaki |
| Kanomata | 鹿又 | 21.2 | | Ishinomaki |
| Sobanokami | 曽波神 | 23.7 | | Ishinomaki |
| Ishinomaki | 石巻 | 27.9 | ■ Senseki Line | Ishinomaki |
| Rikuzen-Inai | 陸前稲井 | 30.9 | | Ishinomaki |
| Watanoha | 渡波 | 35.9 | | Ishinomaki |
| Mangokuura | 万石浦 | 37.0 | | Ishinomaki |
| Sawada | 沢田 | 38.3 | | Ishinomaki |
| Urashuku | 浦宿 | 42.4 | | Onagawa |
| Onagawa | 女川 | 44.7 | | Onagawa |

== History ==
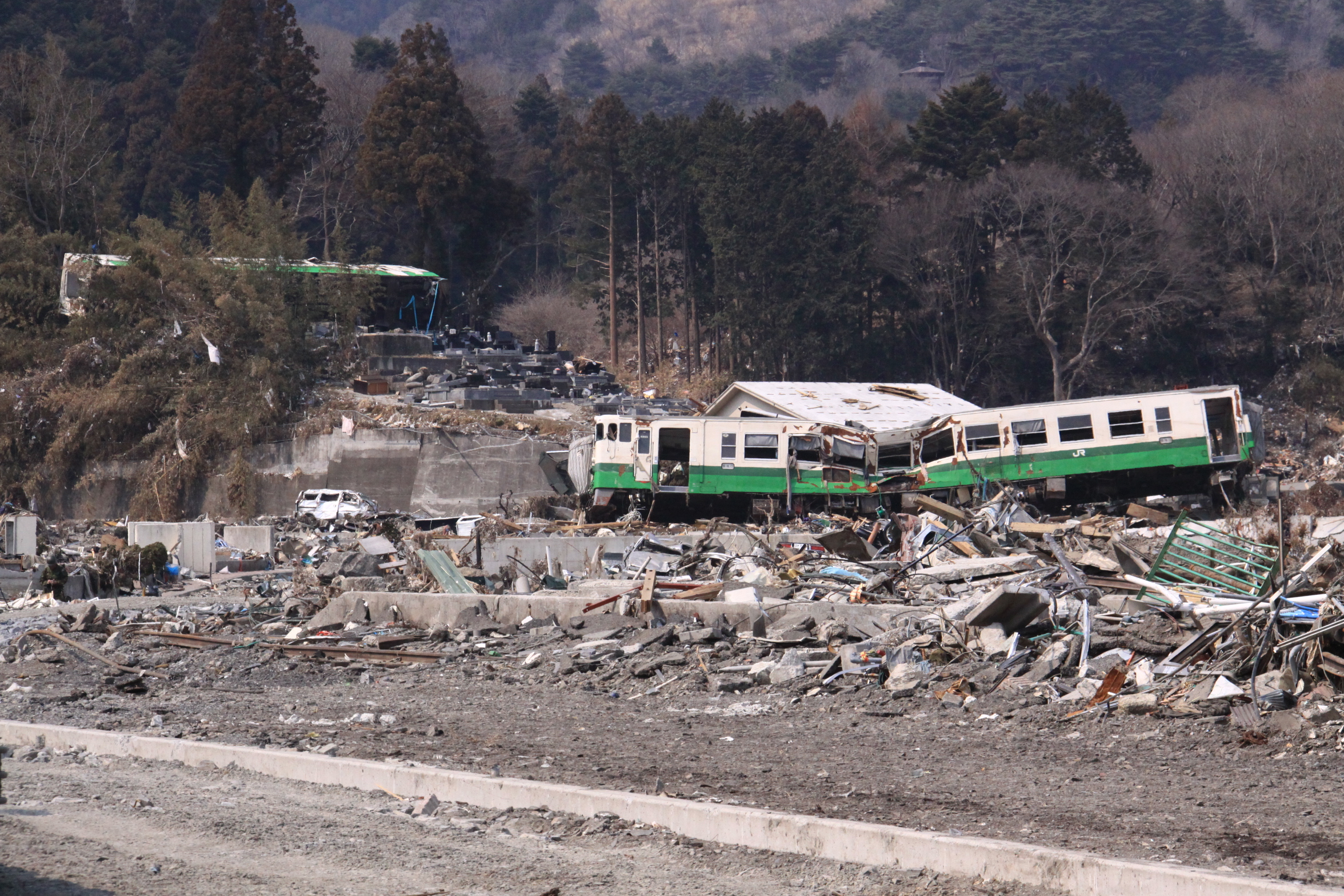
The remains of a train hit by the tsunami that hit in March 2011 among a scattered cemetery in Onagawa.

The Senpoku Light Railway opened a 762 mm (2 ft 6 in) gauge line from Kogota to Ishinomaki in 1912. The line was nationalised in 1919 and converted to 1,067 mm (3 ft 6 in) gauge in 1920. The Oshika Light Railway opened a 762 mm (2 ft 6 in) gauge horse-drawn tramway from Ishinomaki to Watanoha in 1915, and extended it to Onagawa in 1924. A petrol-driven locomotive was introduced in 1926. The line was nationalised in 1939 and converted to 1,067 mm (3 ft 6 in) gauge the same year.

In 1958, the line was extended 1.4 km (0.87 mi) to the Onagawa Port, but that extension closed in 1980.

The line was severely damaged by the 2011 Tōhoku earthquake and tsunami on 11 March 2011; the Kogota - Ishinomaki section being out of service for two months, the Ishinomaki - Watanoha section for a year, and the Watanoha - Urashuku section for two years. The final section from Urashuku to Onagawa reopened on 21 March 2015.

== See also ==
- List of railway lines in Japan
