= Japan National Route 398 =

National highway in Japan

National Route 398
- 国道398号
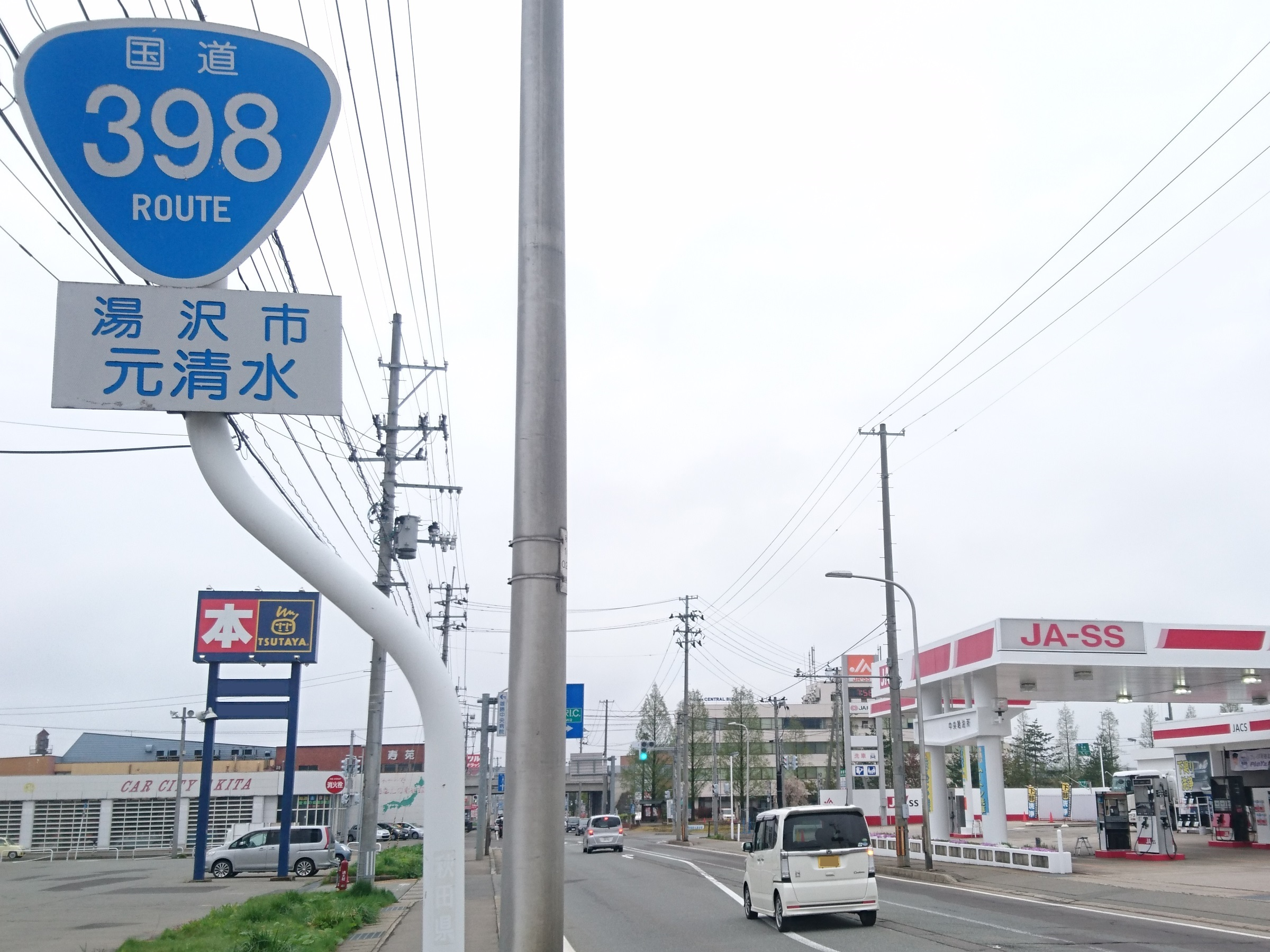

Route information
- Length: 273.6 km (170.0 mi)

Location
- Country: Japan

Highway system
- National highways of Japan; Expressways of Japan
← National Route 397	→ National Route 399

National Route 398 is a national highway of Japan connecting Ishinomaki, Miyagi and Yurihonjō, Akita in Japan, with a total length of 273.6 km (170.01 mi).

== History ==
Many sections of the highway along the Sanriku Coast were inundated, destroyed, or swept away by the 2011 Tōhoku earthquake and tsunami event.
