= Onagawa Station =

Railway station in Onagawa, Miyagi Prefecture, Japan

Onagawa Station 女川駅
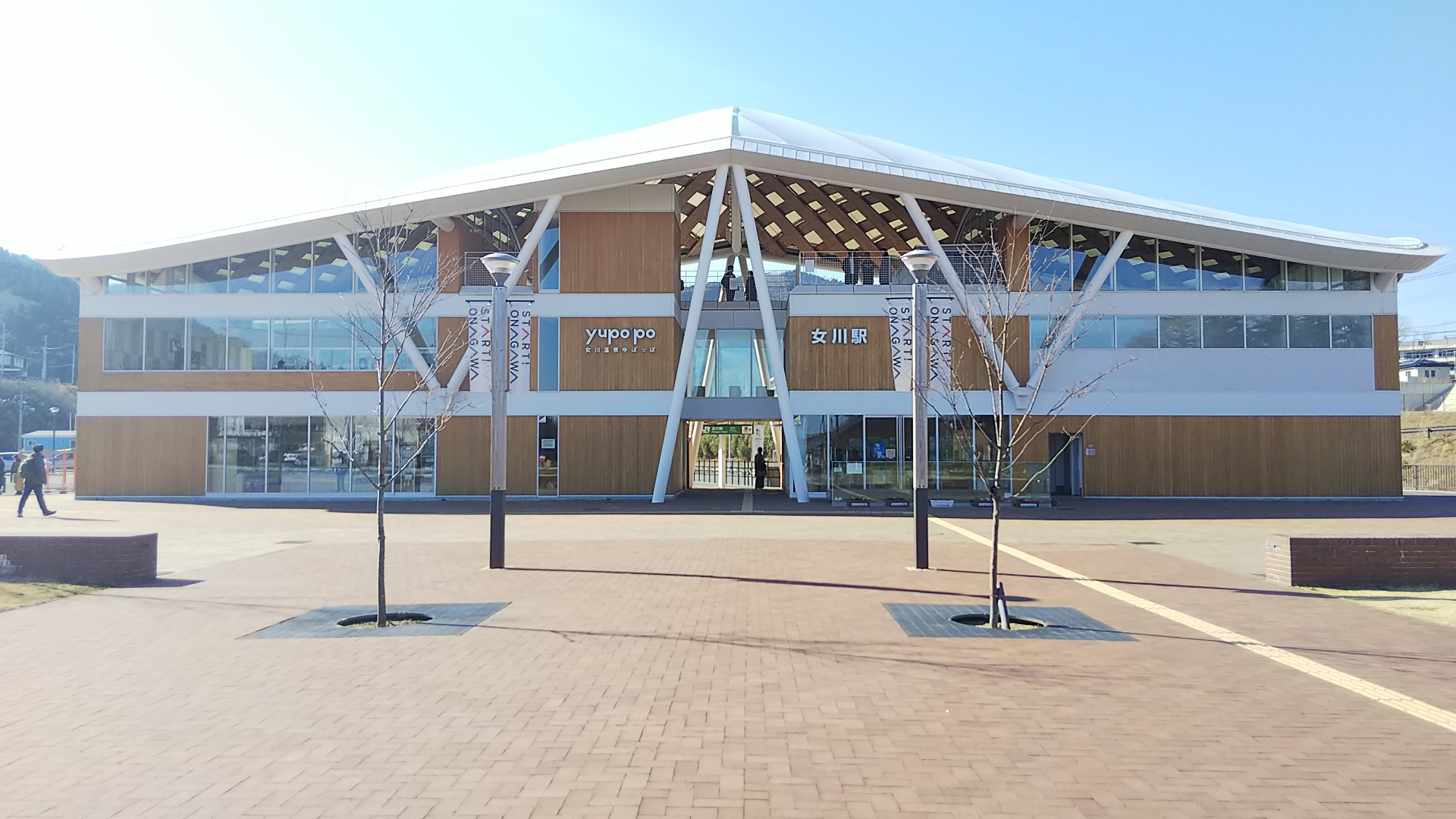
- Station structure, March 2019

General information
- Location: Onagawahama Ohara, Onagawa Town, Oshika District, Miyagi Prefecture 986-2261; Japan
- Coordinates: 38°26′47″N 141°26′42″E
- Operator: JR East
- Line: Ishinomaki Line
- Distance: 44.9 km (27.9 mi) from Kogota
- Platforms: 1 bay platform
- Tracks: 1

Construction
- Structure type: At grade

Other information
- Status: Staffed
- Website: Official website

History
- Opened: 7 October 1939; 86 years ago

Passengers
- FY2021: 161 (boarding only)

Services
Preceding station	JR East	Following station
Urashuku towards Kogota	Ishinomaki Line	Terminus
Urashuku towards Sendai	Senseki-Tōhoku Line Rapid	Terminus
Location
- Location within Miyagi Prefecture Location within Tohoku, Japan Location within Japan

Onagawa Station (女川駅, Onagawa-eki) is a railway station in the town of Onagawa, Miyagi Prefecture, Japan, operated by East Japan Railway Company (JR East).

== Lines ==
Onagawa Station is a terminal station on the Ishinomaki Line, located 44.9 kilometers from the opposing terminus of the line at Kogota Station.

== Station layout ==
The station has one bay platform, serving a single track, connected to the station building by a footbridge.

== History ==
Onagawa Station opened on October 7, 1939. The station was absorbed into the JR East network upon the privatization of JNR on April 1, 1987. Operations were suspended after the tsunami on March 11, 2011 which destroyed the station building and nearby railway tracks.

Just over four years later, on March 21, 2015, the reconstructed Onagawa Station reopened marking the restoration of the entire Ishinomaki Line. The new station building features an integrated community center and public bathing facility on the upper floors. The building was designed by Pritzker Architecture Prize winning architect Shigeru Ban, who also contributed to the design of temporary housing structures in the town in the wake of the March 2011 tsunami.

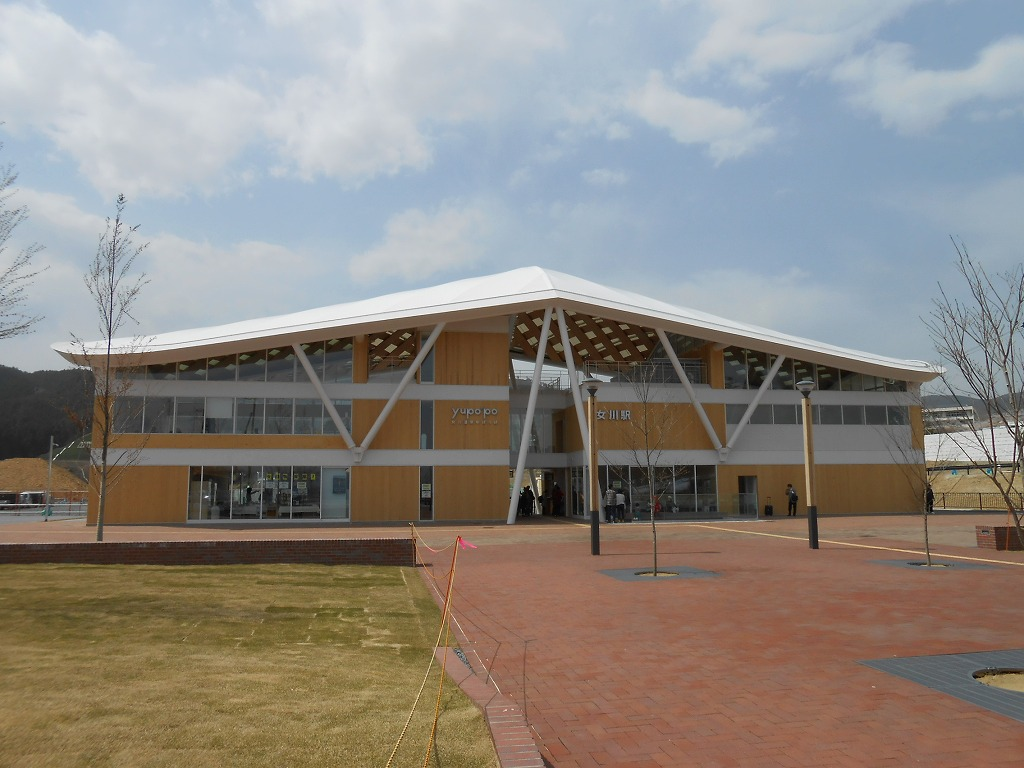
Reconstructed Onagawa Station in 2015

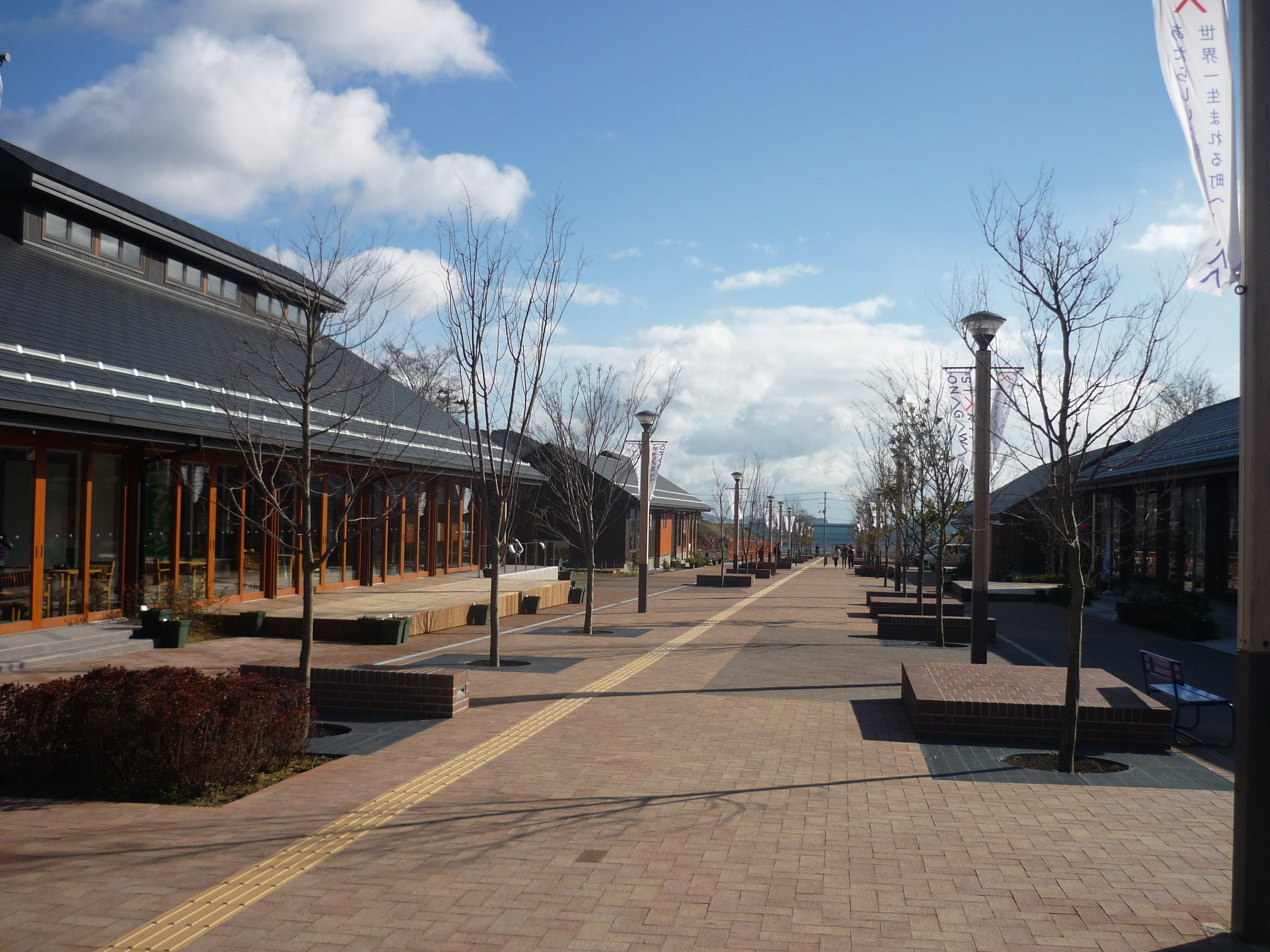
Shopping street outside Onogawa station, December 2015

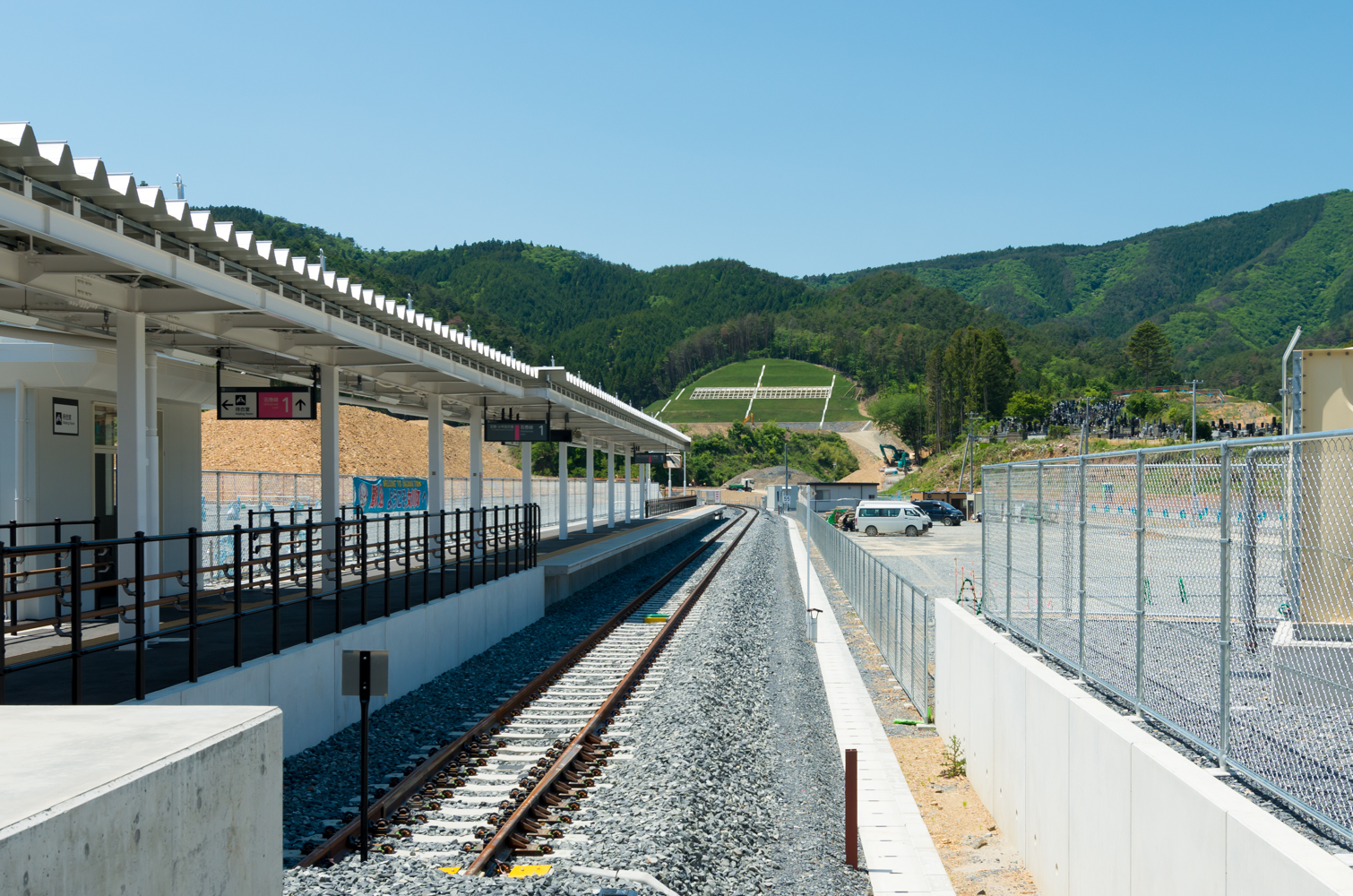
Platforms, May 2015

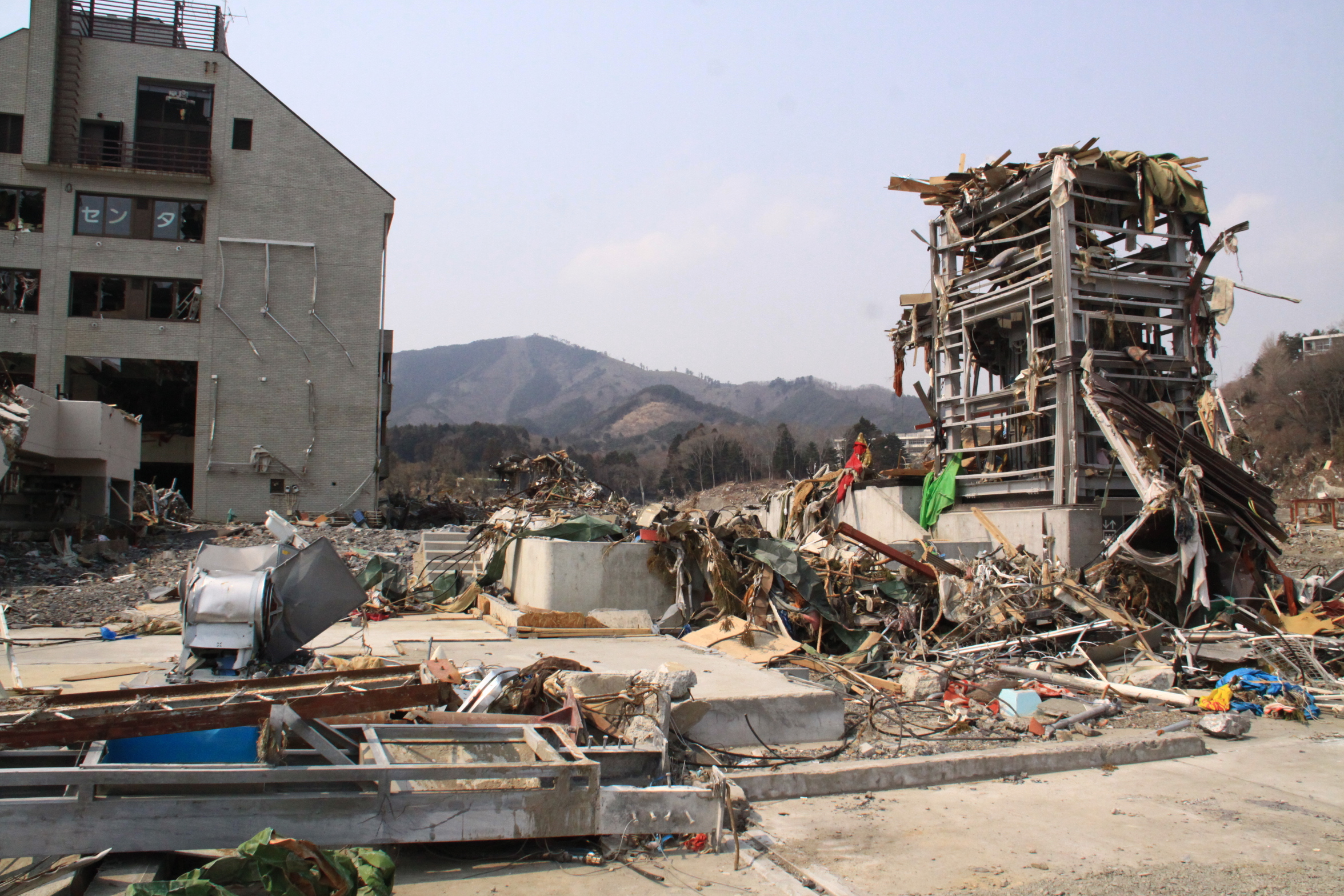
The remains of the station shortly after the 2011 Tōhoku earthquake and tsunami

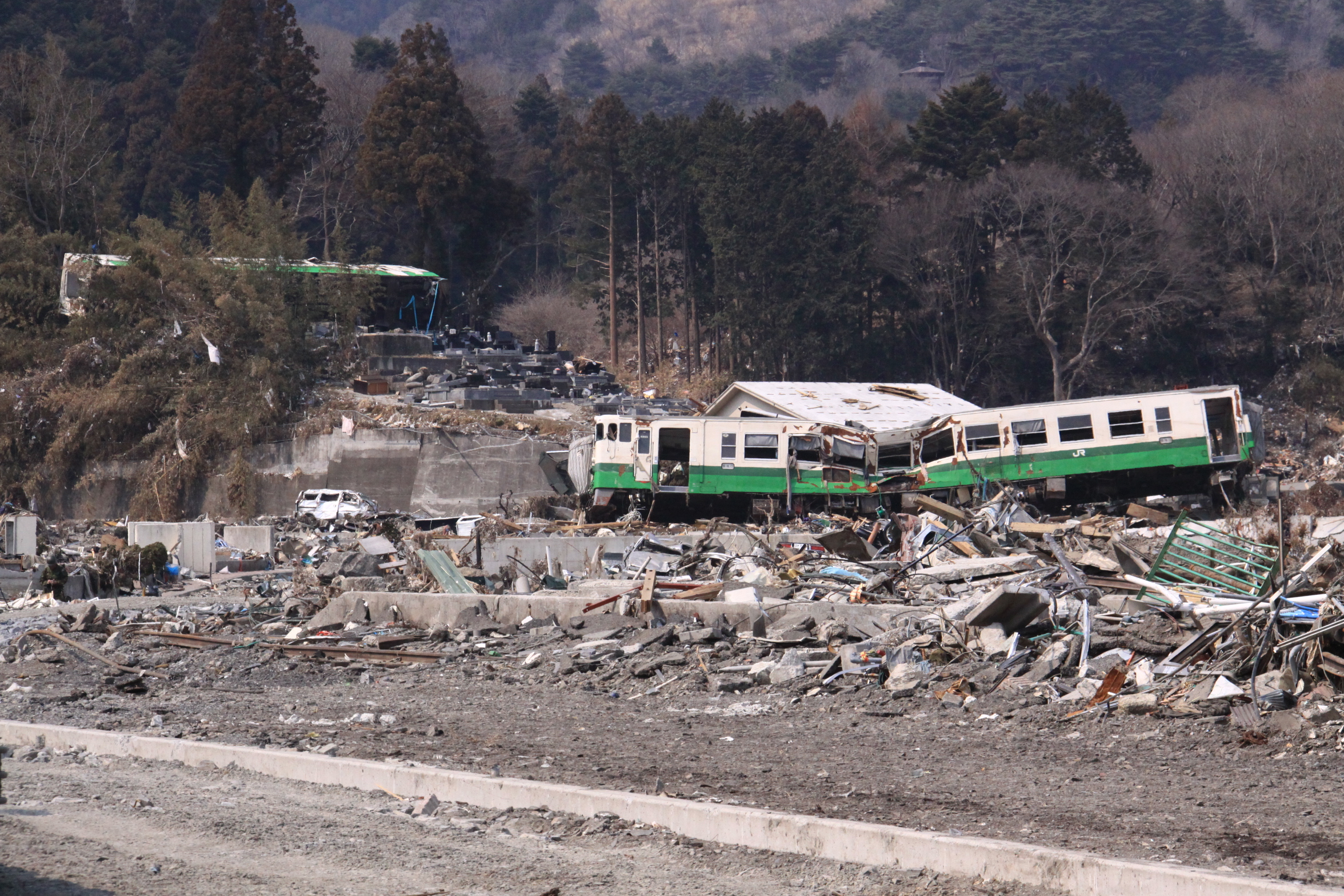
The wreckage of KiHa 48 502 and KiHa 48 1512 following the tsunami, having been swept off the tracks at Onagawa and washed uphill by the wave

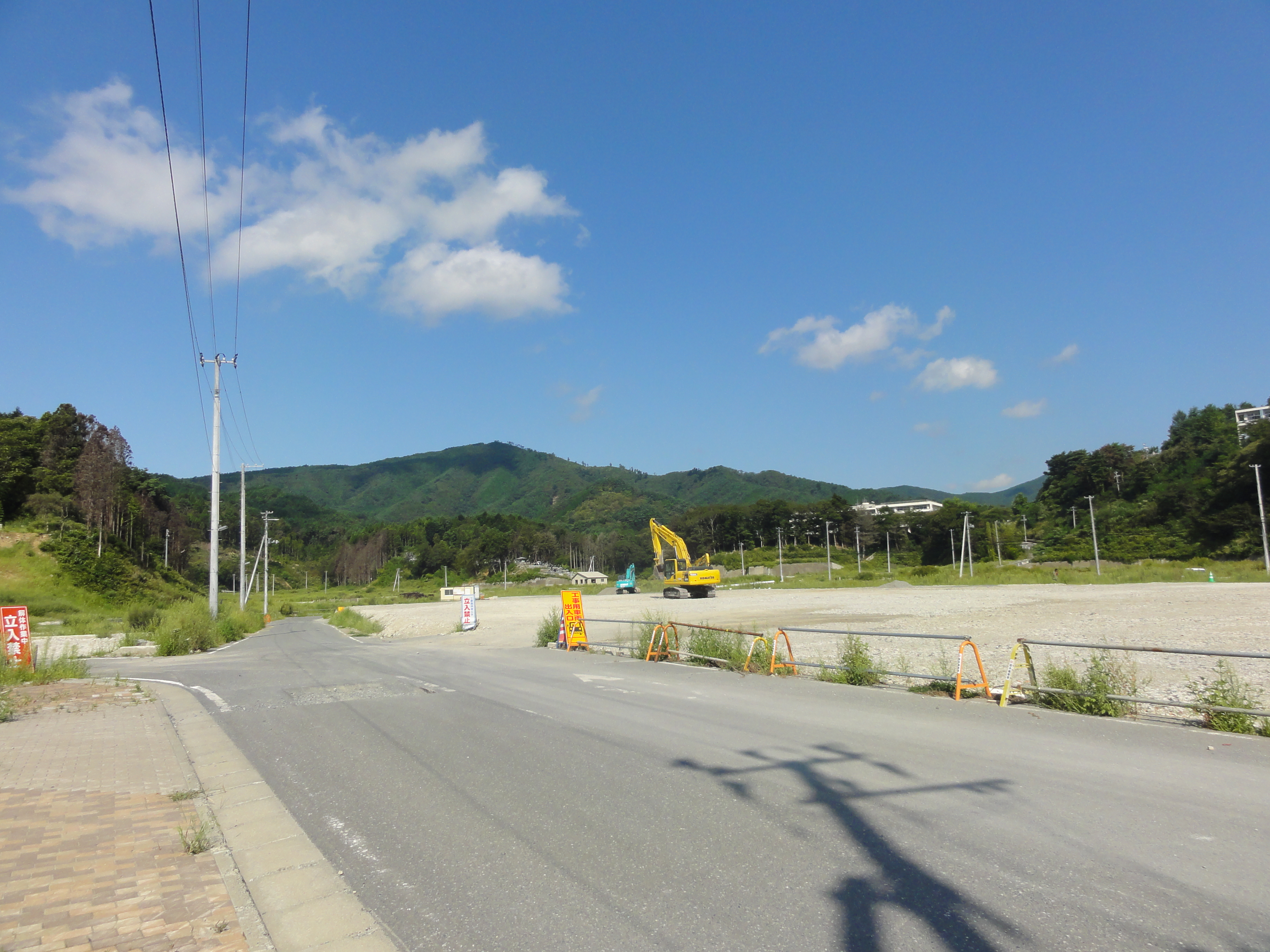
Cleared station site, September 2012

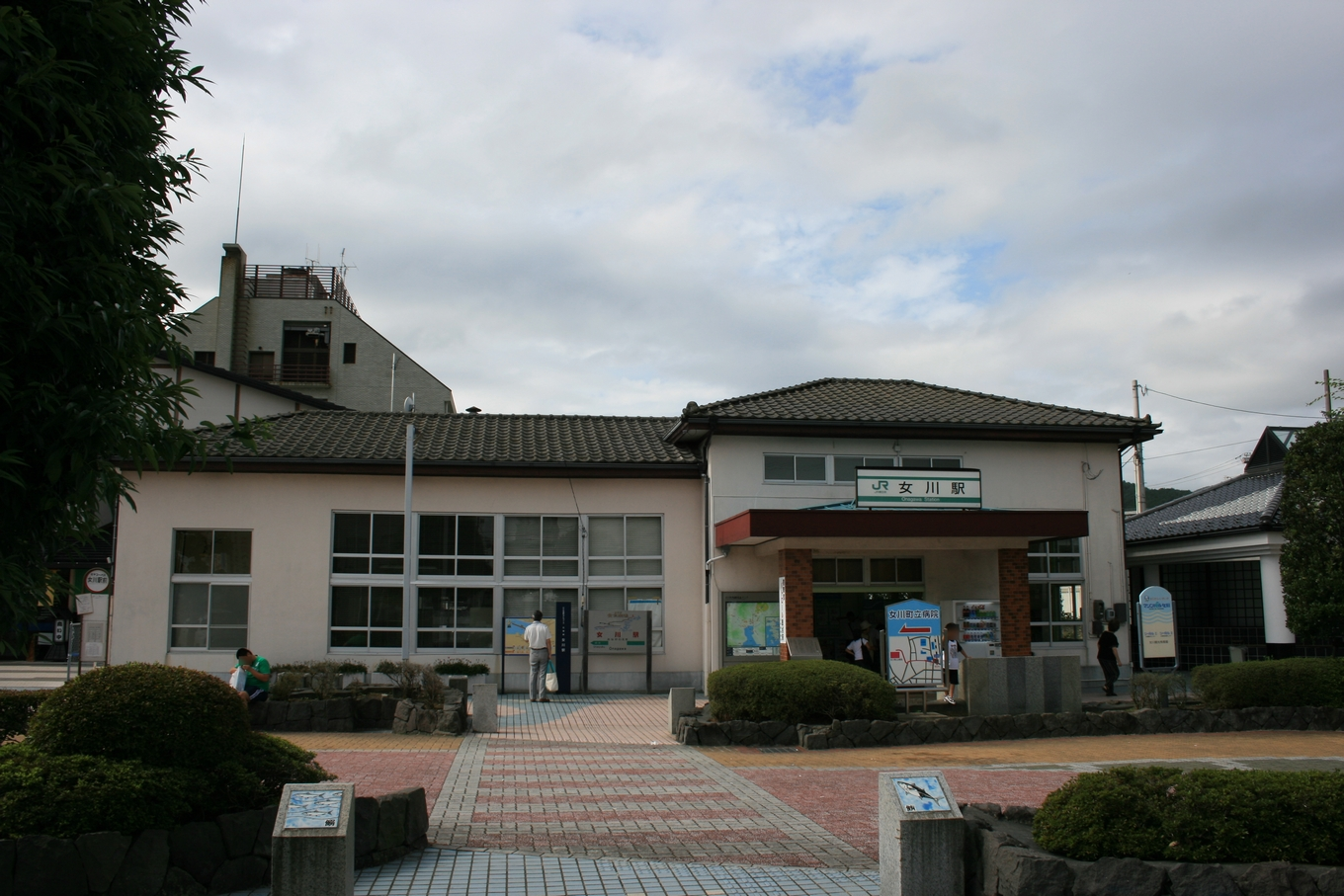
Original station buildings in 2007

== Surrounding area ==
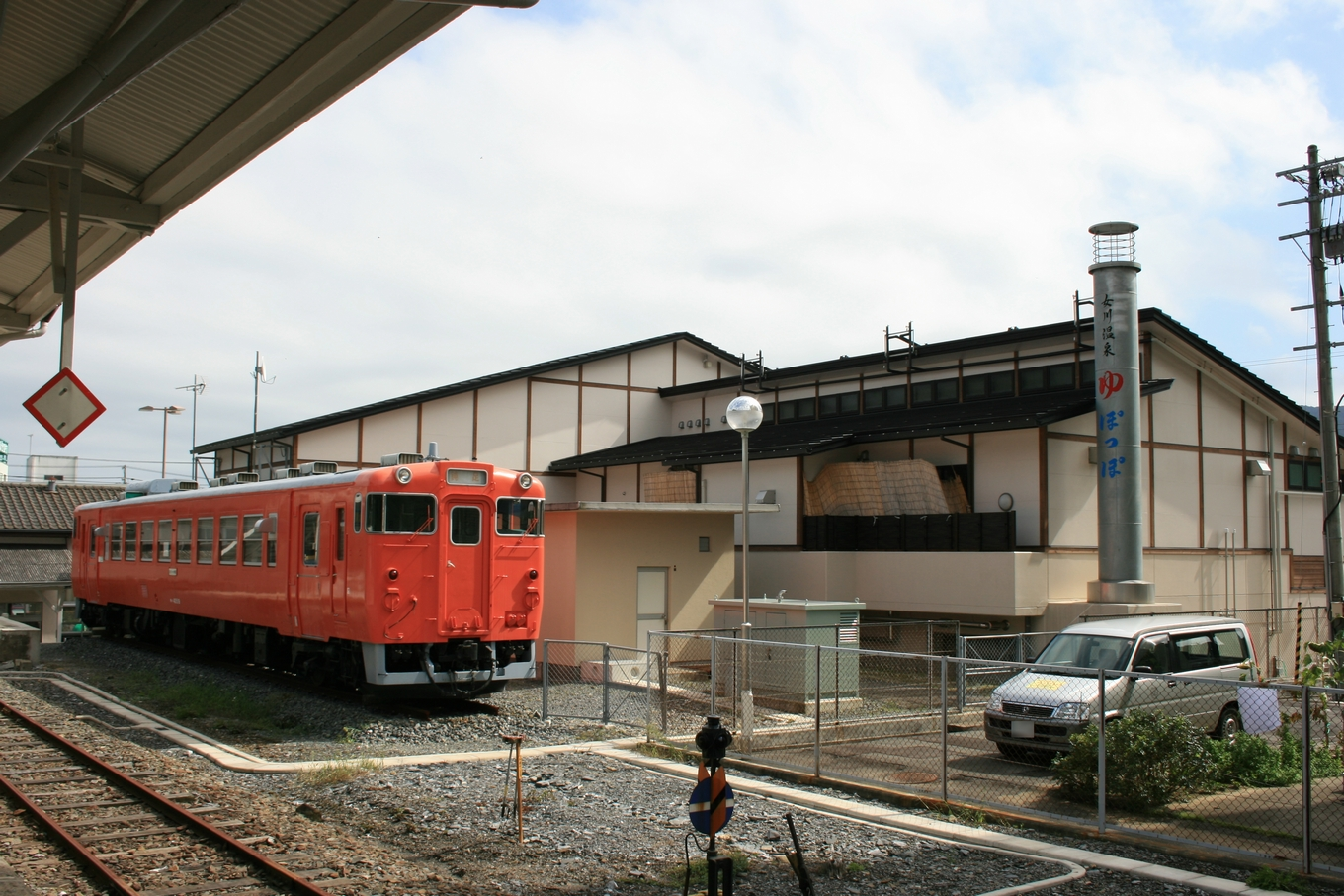
The KiHa 40 series DMU car originally parked next to the station, seen here in 2007

Before the tsunami disaster, a preserved JR East KiHa 40 series diesel multiple unit car, KiHa 40 519, was parked next to the "Yupoppo" onsen facility next to the station, for use as a lounge space.

- Onagawa Port
- Onagawa Post Office
- National Route 398

== Passenger statistics ==
In fiscal 2018, the station was used by an average of 222 passengers daily (boarding passengers only).

== See also ==
- List of railway stations in Japan
