= Hybrid train =

Type of train

A hybrid train is a locomotive, railcar or train that uses an onboard rechargeable energy storage system (RESS), placed between the power source (often a diesel engine prime mover) and the traction transmission system connected to the wheels. Since most diesel locomotives are diesel-electric, they have all the components of a series hybrid transmission except the storage battery, making this a relatively simple prospect.

Surplus energy from the power source, or energy derived from regenerative braking, charges the storage system. During acceleration, stored energy is directed to the transmission system, boosting that available from the main power source. In existing designs, the storage system can be electric traction batteries, or a flywheel. The energy source is diesel, liquefied petroleum gas, or hydrogen (for fuel cells) and transmission is direct mechanical, electric or hydrostatic.

Diesel electric locomotives may have most of what they need for regenerative braking since they might already use dynamic braking. This uses the traction motors as generators to convert much of the train's kinetic energy to electrical energy, but without a way to store the generated electricity it is simply converted to heat with large rooftop resistor banks and dumped to the atmosphere with the aid of cooling fans.

Using a storage system means that a non-fully electric train can use regenerative (as opposed to merely dynamic) braking, and even shut down the main power source whilst idling or stationary. Reducing energy consumption provides environmental benefits and economic savings. A smaller scale version of the concept is found in hybrid automobiles, such as the Chevrolet Volt.

== Development ==
The Patton Motor Car, manufactured by Patton Motor Company, was a gas-electric hybrid system, although the term hybrid was not yet in use. William H. Patton filed for a patent on February 25, 1889; the drawings on his patent application resemble later descriptions of his first prototype. Patton built a tram car that was in experimental service in Pullman, Illinois in 1891 and a small Patton locomotive was sold to a street railway company in Cedar Falls, Iowa in 1897. The latter used a 2-cylinder, 25 hp gasoline engine to drive a 220-volt generator that served to charge the 200-Ampere hour 100-cell lead acid battery in parallel with the traction motors. The engine ran at constant speed, with a shunt-wound generator that also served as an electric starter motor. A conventional series-parallel controller was used for the two 35 hp traction motors that drove the wheels of the locomotive.

The term mixed drive train came to be used at the turn of twentieth century. The Pieper system was applied to Belgian (Vicinal tramway) and French (Compagnie des Chemins de Fer de Grande Banlieue) railcars as early as 1911.

The Thomas system, manufactured by Thomas Transmission Ltd. of England, which is similar in design to the mechanical part of the Hybrid Synergy Drive, was used in the United Kingdom and tested in New Zealand in a NZR RM class railcar.

=== China ===
In 2010, CRRC Ziyang (then CSR Ziyang) developed CKD6E-5000, a small shunting locomotive capable of 1,000 kW combined power based on their existing shunter design. It later received a contract from China Railway to develop a high-power, hybrid shunter; the effort produced HXN6 in 2015, a shunter with an 1,860 kW traction power that was able to reduce fuel consumption by 25% to 40% and motor active hours by up to 91% compared to diesel shunters of a similar role already in service. HXN6 received type certification and manufacturing license from the National Railway Administration in 2020, a first for Chinese hybrid locomotives.

In 2014, CRRC Changchun (then CNR Changchun) produced the CJ5 series prototypes, multiple units that can be equipped with a mixture of catenary, battery, and/or diesel power. Only catenary-battery and catenary-diesel prototypes were built, and no additional trainsets were produced since.

In 2018, CRRC Dalian designed and manufactured FXN3B, a "mild hybrid" shunter with a 2,500 kW total engine power. CRRC Dalian continued the work and produced FXN3D in 2022, a shunter with similar visual and power profile as FXN3B but considered a "full hybrid"; the diesel motor is responsible for only about 50% of its total engine power (compared to FXN3B's 85%). CRRC Ziyang is also involved in FXN3B's mass production, and the first batch of mass-produced FXN3B's entered service in 2024.

=== Czechoslovakia ===
In 1986, Czechoslovak locomotive manufacturer ČKD built a prototype hybrid shunting locomotive termed the DA 600. The locomotive was powered a 190 kW diesel engine and four electric motors, with a maximum overall power 360 kW powered from batteries. The batteries were recharged while the diesel engine was running, by regenerative braking or from external electric power.

After tests on the Railway test circuit Velim and some minor tweaks, the locomotive was lent to the Olomouc train depot and successfully operated there for ten years. Czechoslovak socialist economics failed to start mass production, mainly because of a lack of proper battery manufacturing capacities.

=== Japan ===
In May 2003, JR East started test runs using a KiYa E991 "NE Train" ("New Energy Train") railcar, testing the system performance in cold regions.

The design had two 65-kilowatt fuel cells and six hydrogen tanks under the floor, with a lithium-ion battery on the roof. The test train was capable of 100 kilometres per hour (60 mph) with a range of 50–100 kilometres (31–62 mi) between hydrogen refills. Research was underway into the use of regenerative braking to recharge the test train's batteries, intending to increase the range further. JR had stated that it hoped to introduce the train into scheduled local service during the summer of 2007. Technology tested on this train was incorporated in the KiHa E200 diesel/battery railcars entering service in 2007.

The first JR Freight Class HD300 shunting locomotive was delivered from Toshiba on 30 March 2010. The new locomotive uses lithium ion batteries, and is designed to reduce exhaust emissions by at least 30% to 40% and noise levels by at least 10 dB compared with existing Class DE10 diesel locomotives.

==== Multiple units ====
- NE Train, experimental railcar
- KiHa E200, single-car units introduced in 2007
- HB-E300 series, introduced in 2010
- HB-E210 series, introduced in 2015
- YC1 series, introduced in 2018
- HC85 series, introduced in 2022

==== Locomotives ====
- JR Freight Class HD300, delivered in 2010, entering service from 2012
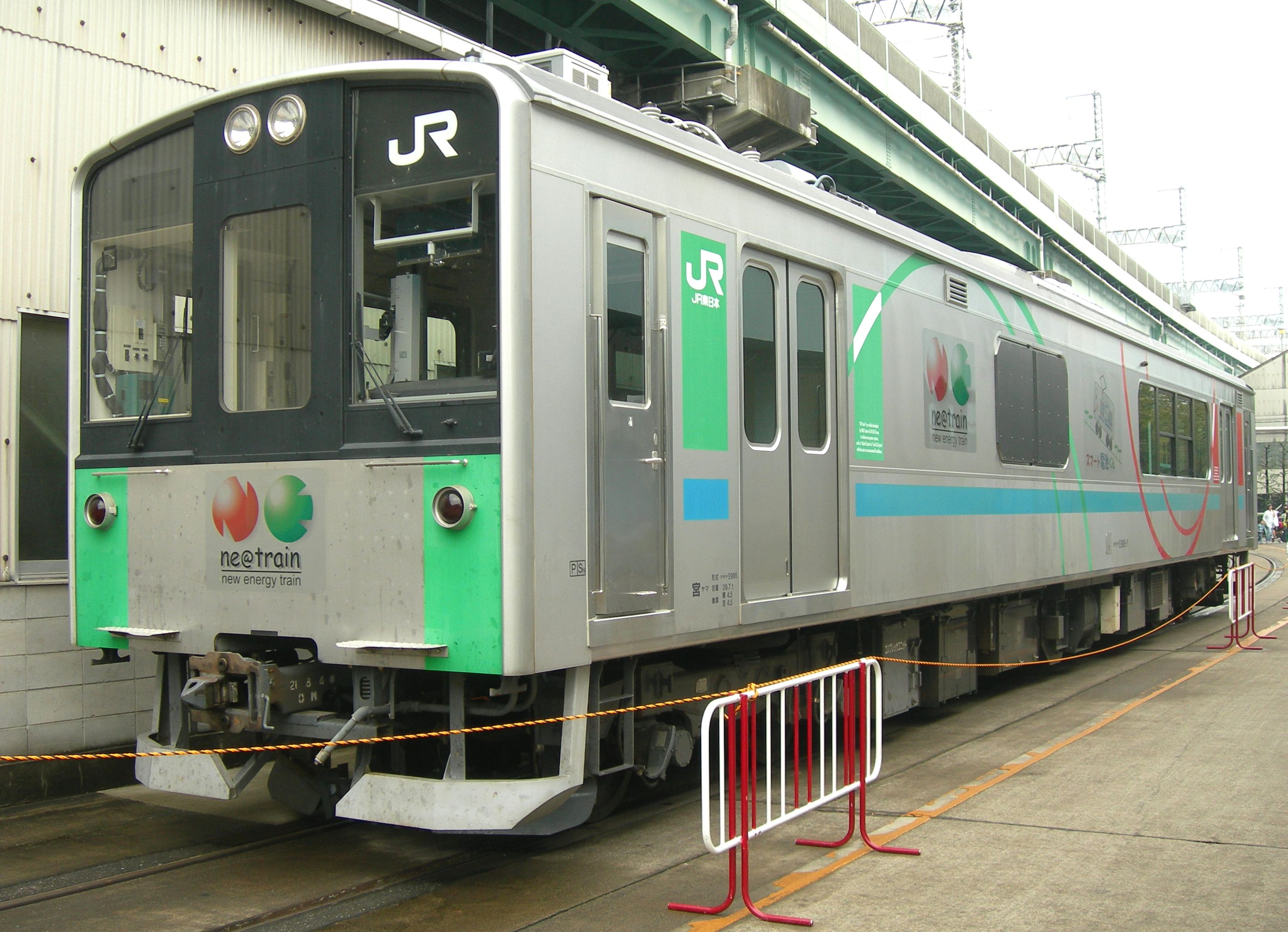
The experimental "NE Train"

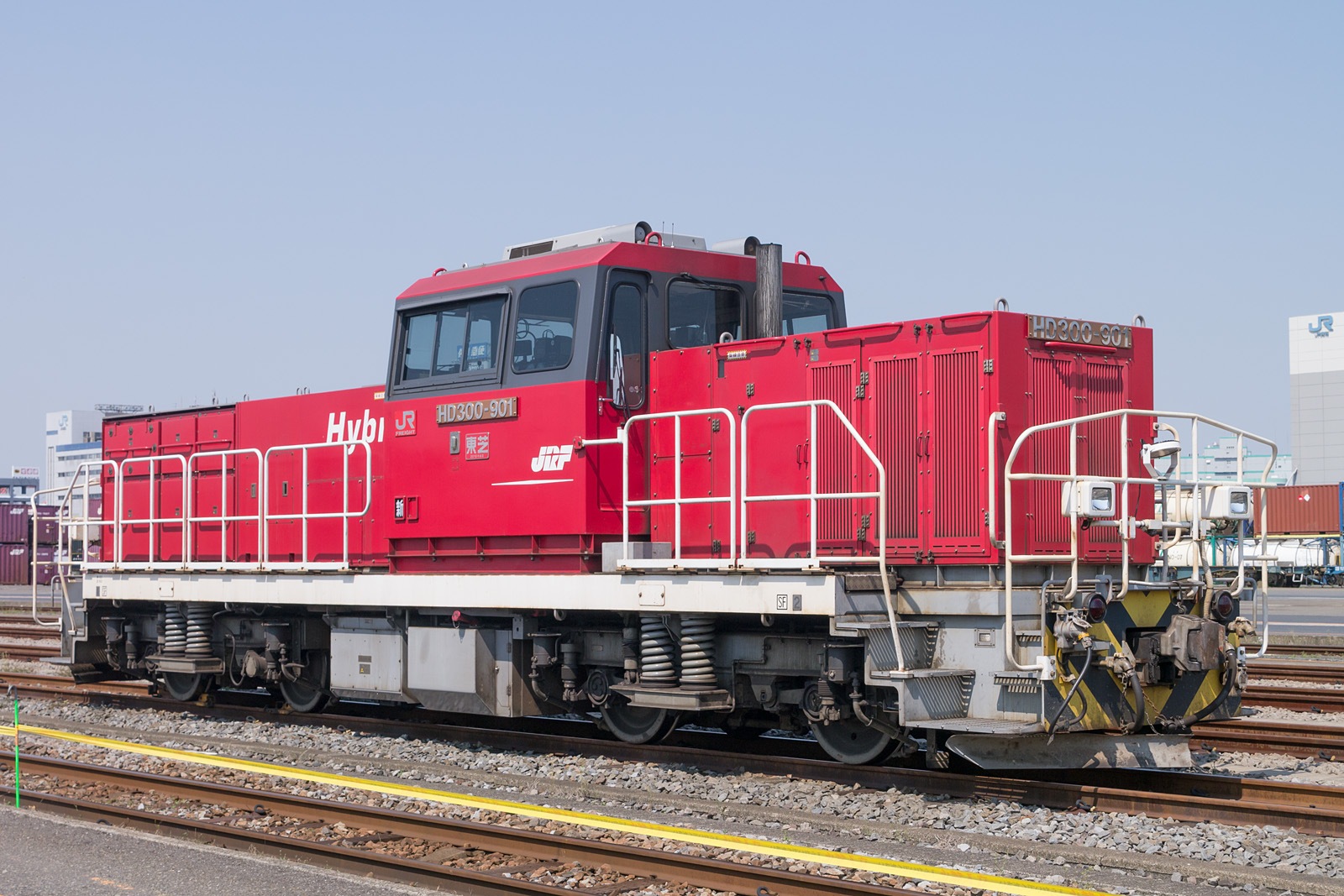
Hybrid Class HD300 locomotive

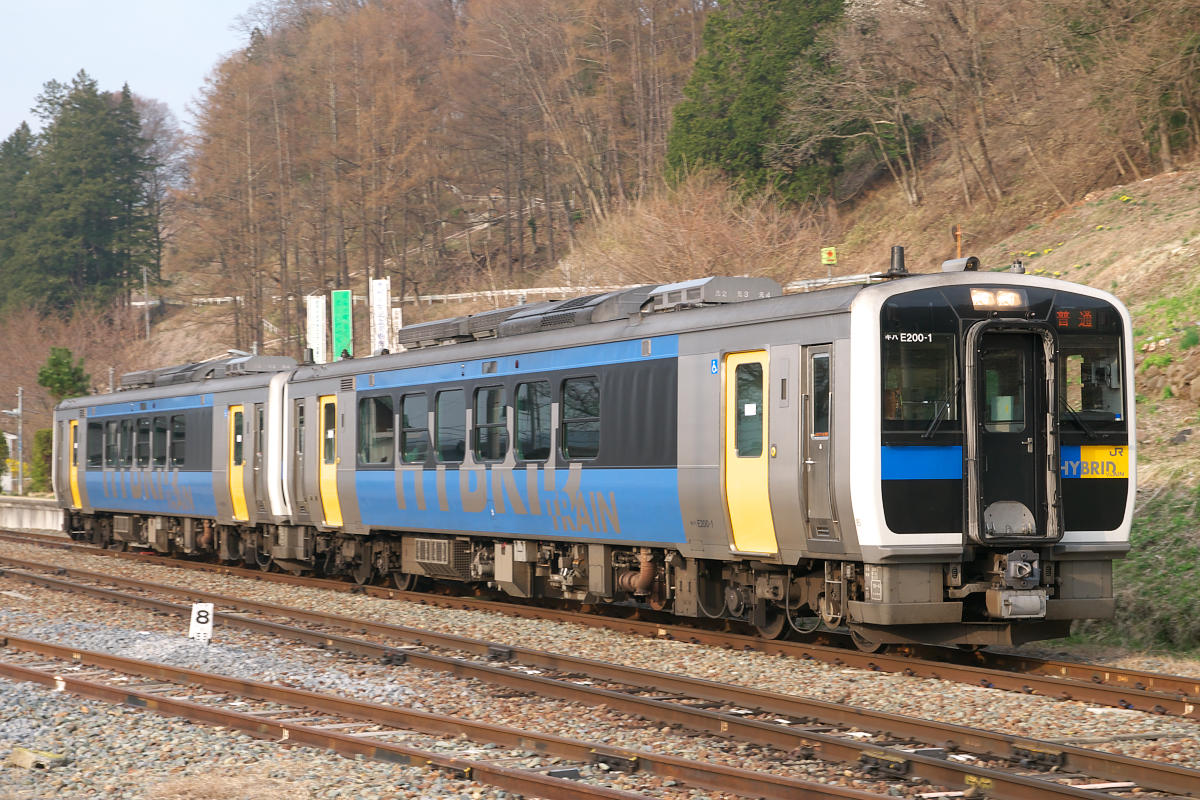
A pair of KiHa E200 hybrid diesel railcars

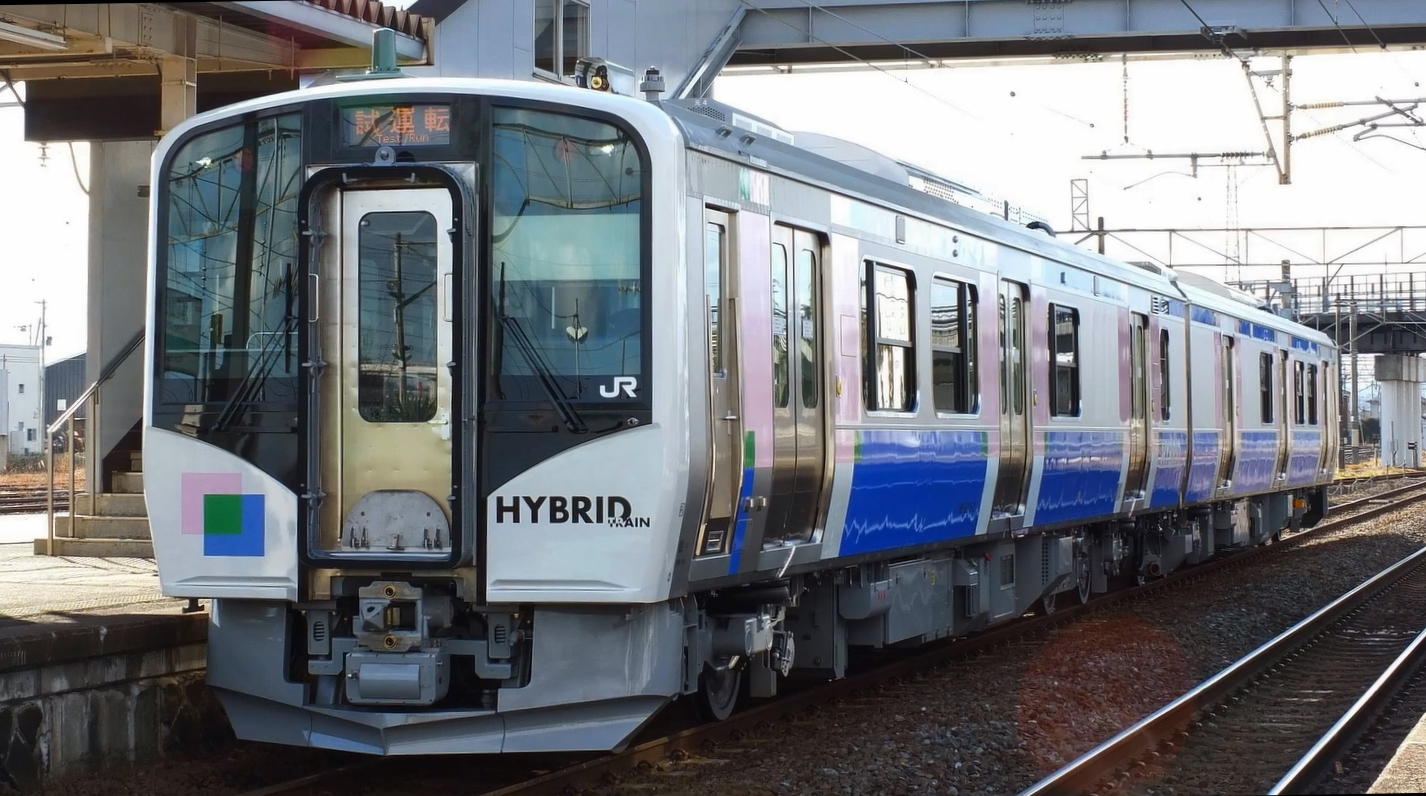
An HB-E210 series hybrid DMU

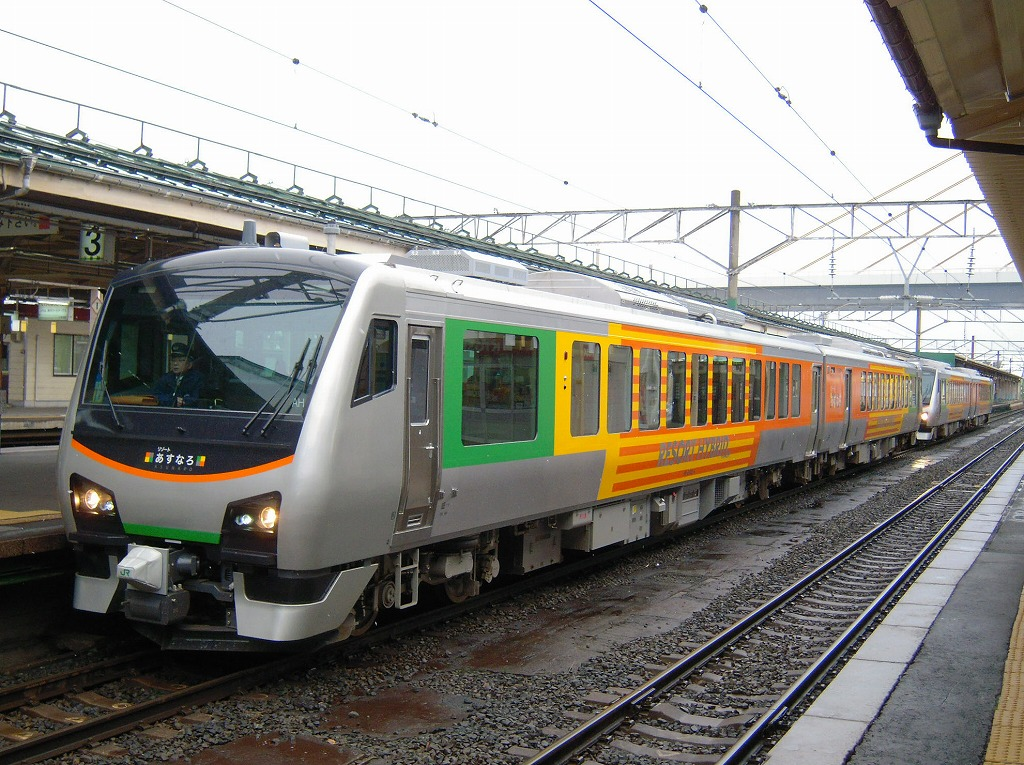
An HB-E300 series hybrid DMU

=== Russia ===
Sinara transport machines is developing the TEM9H, a hybrid version of its TEM9 series diesel shunting locomotives, at its Lyudinovsky Locomotive Plant. This is a 1,200 horsepower, four-axle, locomotive with lithium-ion batteries, supercondensers and AC motors. It is planned to be in production early in 2013.

=== United Kingdom ===
A Sunday-service operated on the Stourbridge Town Branch Line for a period of two years, using a flywheel-based energy storage system built by Parry People Movers. In 2008, a pair of British Rail Class 139 railcars were ordered to provide full service on the branch line from 2009 onwards.

During 2007, a modified Class 43 power car ran on the Great Central Railway and then as part of the Network Rail New Measurement Train (a 200-kilometre per hour track-recording train). The Hitachi developed system used a battery-assisted diesel-electric drive system; the hope being that it would demonstrate a cut in emissions by up to 50 percent and a reduction in fuel consumption costs of 20 percent. The modified locomotive, named Hayabusa, was semi-permanently attached to a converted passenger carriage containing the battery bank during the testing period.

Since 2015, Vivarail has converted some former London Underground D78 Stock for rural services, branding them as D-Train. Some of these converted Class 230 units employ hybrid diesel-electric series propulsion.

In 2022, Chiltern introduced to revenue service a Class 168 whose diesel hydraulic transmission had been retrofitted with a diesel hybrid drive.

=== North America ===
==== Railpower ====
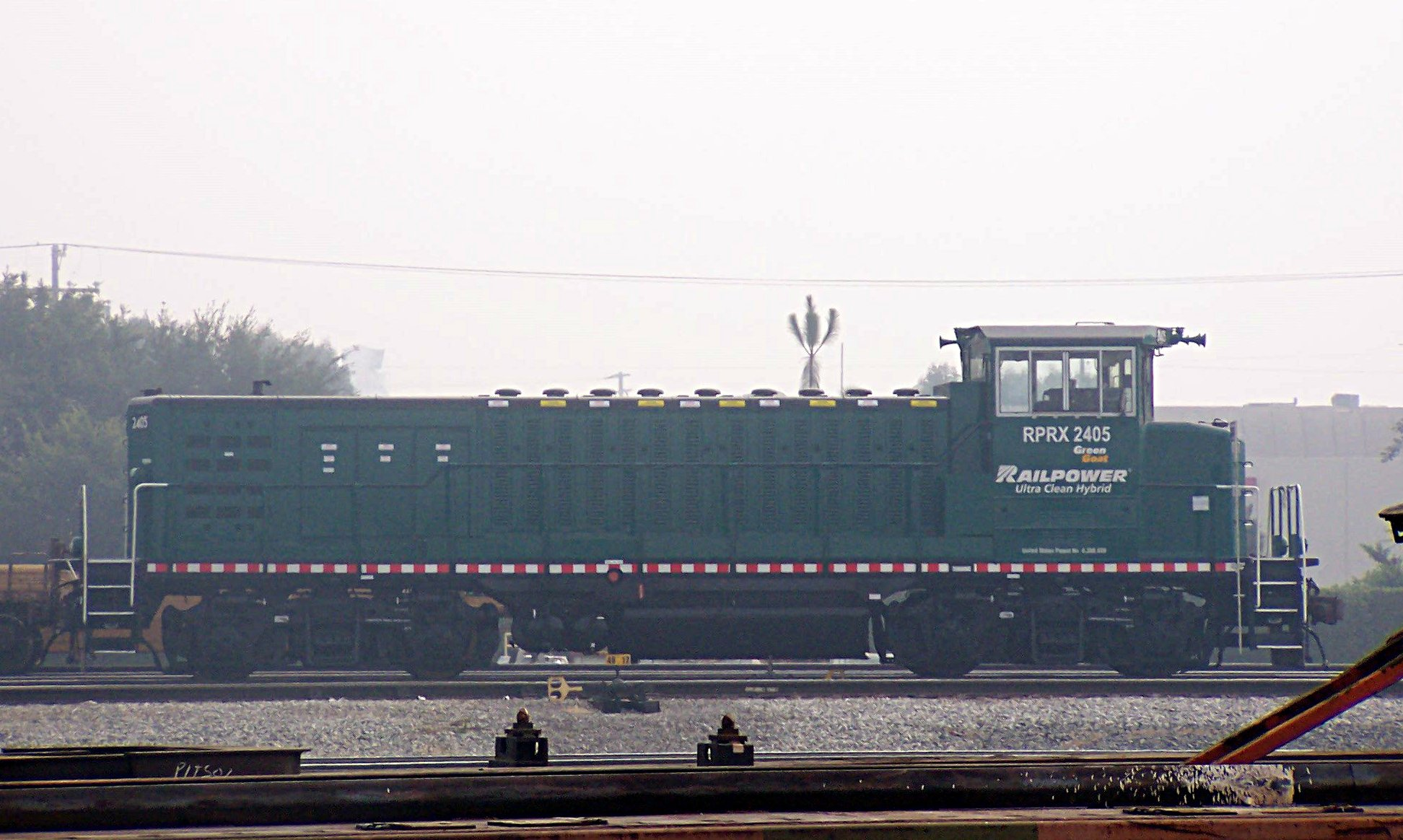
A Green Goat hybrid shunting locomotive

In 2004, Railpower Technologies, a Canadian company, began running pilots in the United States with the Green Goat shunting locomotives. The trials led to orders by the Union Pacific and Canadian Pacific Railways, starting in early 2005. These diesel-electric hybrid trains are expected to cut emissions by up to 90 percent and to decrease fuel consumption by up to sixty percent, when compared to conventional diesel-powered locomotives. The "Green Goat" locomotives were intended to be used in marshalling yards.

==== General Electric ====
General Electric (GE) put their hybrid locomotive on display at Los Angeles Union Station on May 24, 2007. The locomotive used regenerative braking and a bank of high-capacity batteries that GE was constructing to achieve its fuel savings and to achieve higher emissions standards than previous ordinary diesel locomotives. It was expected to join GE's current line of Evolution Series locomotives as of May 2007.

==== Savannah, Georgia ====
The city of Savannah, Georgia tested the operation of a W class Melbourne tram in service as a biodiesel fuelled hybrid with on board battery storage in late 2008. Regular service along the River Street Streetcar started on February 11, 2009.

=== Greece ===
Hitachi Hybrid trains began construction in July 2019. They will be available throughout Greece from 2022.

=== France ===
Between 2021 and 2022, the French regions of Centre-Val de Loire, Occitanie, Nouvelle Aquitaine and Grand Est in partnership with SNCF and Alstom, will start test runs using an hybrid Regiolis railcar (Diesel/Battery), before starting regular service on 2023.

=== Brazil ===
Progress Rail delivered two hybrid EMD GT38H locomotives to Brazil around October of 2023, making them the first two in Brazilian revenue freight service.

== See also ==
- Steam diesel hybrid locomotive (combined steam and diesel locomotive)
- Electro-diesel locomotive or Dual-mode locomotive (powered by external electric supply or on-board diesel engine)
- Hybrid vehicle
- Hybrid vehicle drivetrain
- List of hybrid vehicles
- Railpower Technologies
- Renewable energy
- Brookville Liberty Modern Streetcar
