= HB-E210 series =

Japanese hybrid battery/diesel multiple unit train

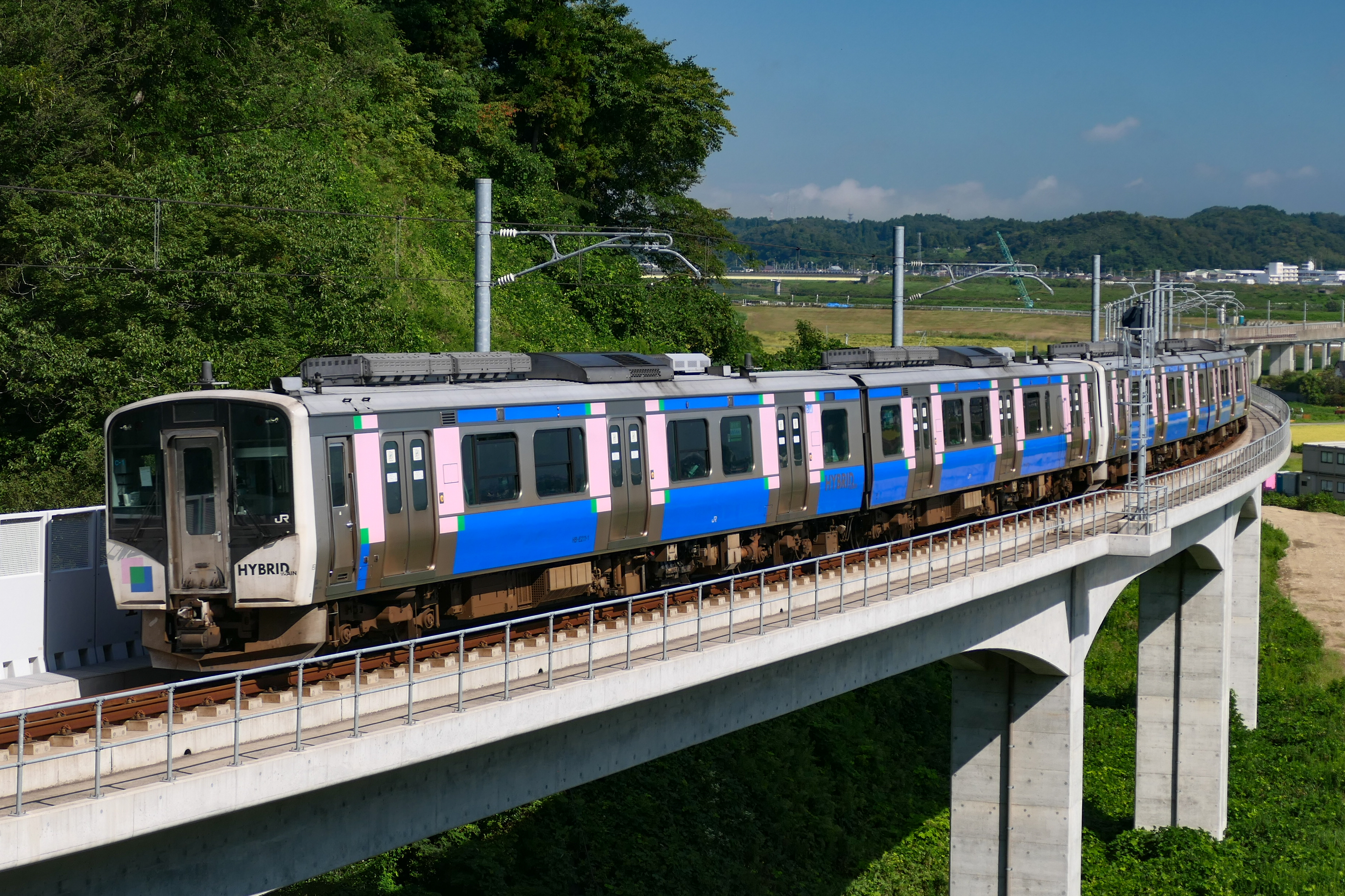
- HB-E210 series set C-1 on the Senseki Line in September 2021
- Manufacturer: J-TREC
- Built at: Yokohama
- Constructed: 2014–2015
- Entered service: 30 May 2015
- Number built: 16 vehicles (8 sets)
- Number in service: 16 vehicles (8 sets)
- Formation: 2 cars per trainset
- Fleet numbers: C-1 – C-8
- Capacity: 262
- Operator: JR East
- Depot: Kogota
- Line served: Senseki-Tōhoku Line

Specifications
- Car body construction: Stainless steel
- Car length: 20,000 mm (65 ft 7 in)
- Width: 2,950 mm (9 ft 8 in)
- Height: 3,620 mm (11 ft 11 in)
- Floor height: 1,130 mm (3 ft 8 in)
- Doors: 3 pairs per side
- Maximum speed: 100 km/h (62 mph)
- Traction system: MT78 traction motors (95 kW x 2 per car)
- Prime mover: DMF15HZB-G (331 kW x 1 per car)
- Safety system: ATS-Ps
- Track gauge: 1,067 mm (3 ft 6 in)

The HB-E210 series (HB-E210系) is a hybrid diesel multiple unit (DMU) train type operated by East Japan Railway Company (JR East) on Senseki-Tōhoku Line services in the Sendai area since 30 May 2015.

== Design ==
=== Concept ===
The HB-E210 series trains were developed from the earlier KiHa E200 type operated on the rural Koumi Line, but to better suit commuter service operations, it incorporates both internal and external design elements from E129 series EMUs, like having three pairs of sliding doors per side and a mixture of transverse and longitudinal seating.

=== Hybrid diesel/battery operation cycle ===
Each car is equipped with a 331 kW 6-cylinder diesel engine and two banks of lithium-ion batteries with a capacity of 15.2 kWh when new. While at standstill, energy stored in the lithium-ion batteries is used to power auxiliary facilities on the train. On starting from standstill, energy stored in the batteries is used to drive the motors via an inverter, with the engine cut out. The engine then cuts in for further acceleration and running on gradients. When braking, the motor acts as a generator, recharging the batteries.

=== Livery ===
The exterior livery consists primarily of blue, the line colour for the Senseki Line, with pink highlights to evoke an image of the cherry blossom trees along the line, and smaller green highlights in JR East's corporate colour.

=== Bogies ===
Each car has one DT75B motored bogie (at the Sendai end) and one TR260B trailer bogie (at the Sekimaki end).

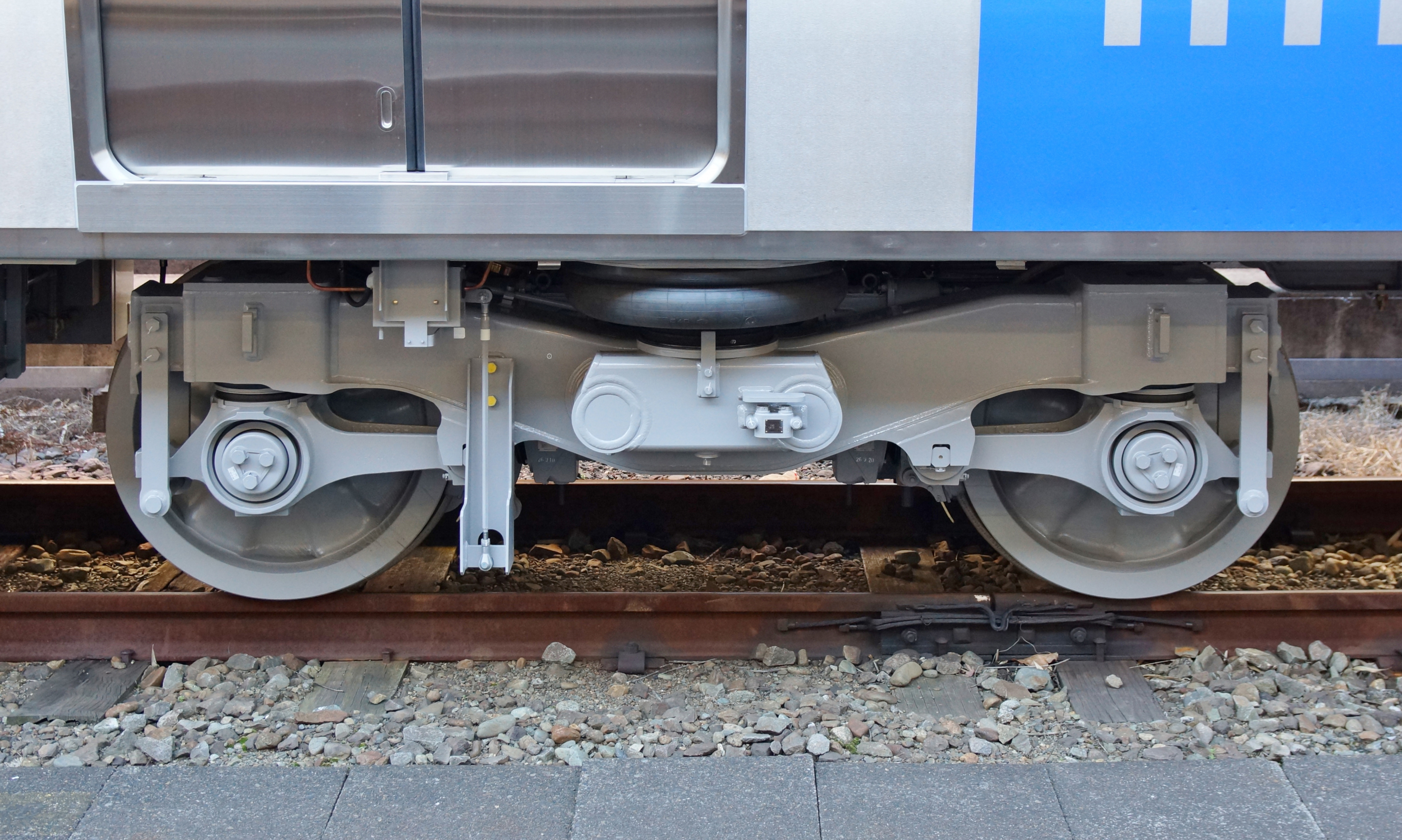
A DT75B motor bogie on the inner end of an HB-E212 car

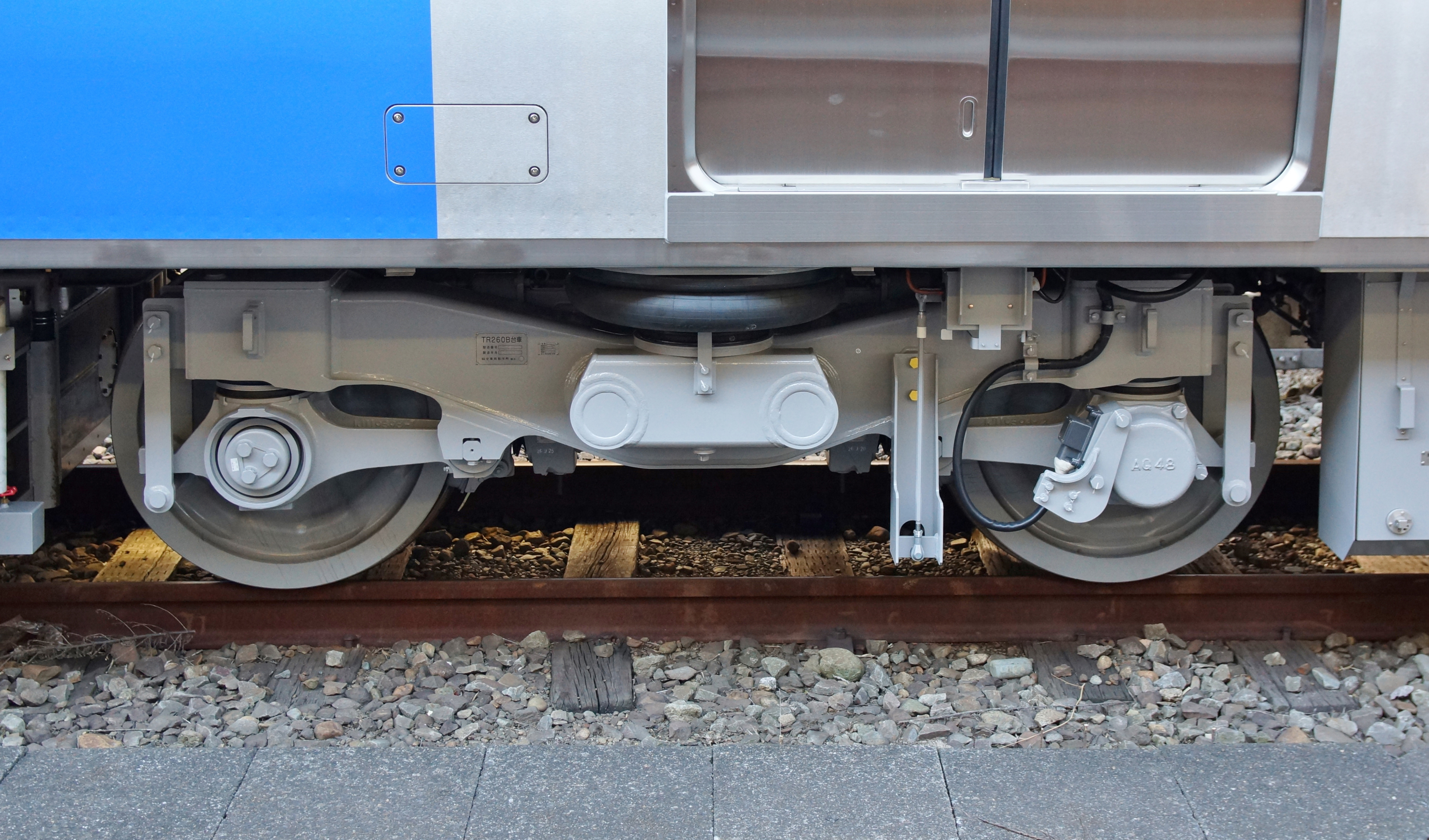
A TR260B trailer bogie on the inner end of an HB-E211 car

== Operations ==
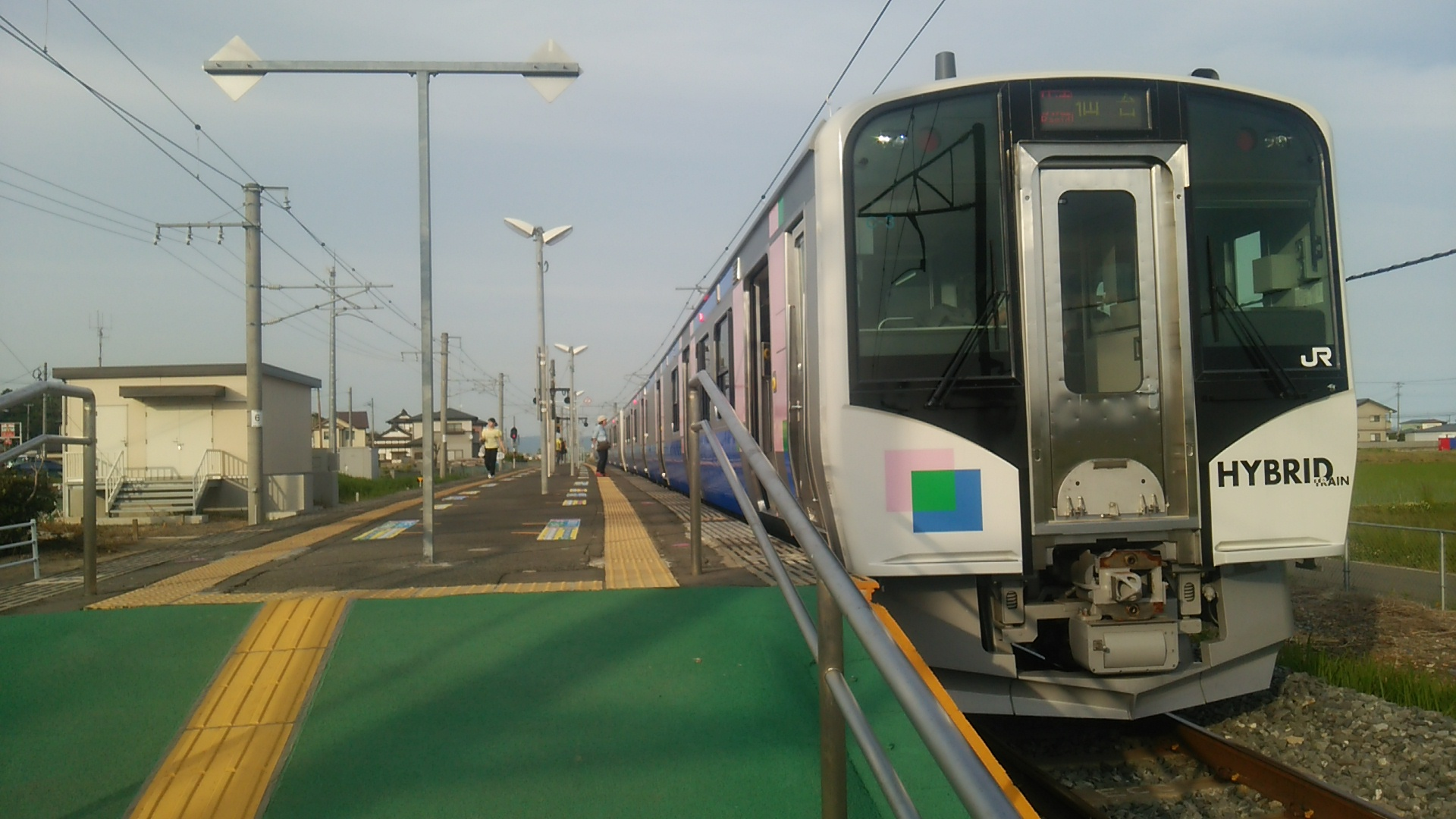
An HB-E210 series on the first day of operations on the Senseki-Tōhoku Line, on 30 May 2015

The HB-E210 series trains were introduced on 30 May 2015 on new Senseki-Tōhoku Line through services operating between Sendai and Ishinomaki via a newly built link connecting the Tohoku Main Line and Senseki Line between Shiogama and Takagimachi.

== Formations ==
The HB-E210 series fleet consists of eight two-car sets (16 vehicles), formed as shown below, with the HB-E211 car at the Sendai (eastern) end of the train.

Numbering	HB-E211-x	HB-E212-x
Capacity (total/seated)	128/42	134/48
Weight (t)	39.6	38.4

== Interior ==
LED lighting is used throughout. The HB-E211 cars have a universal access toilet at the inner end, and the HB-E212 cars have priority seats at both sides on the inner end. The floor height is 1,130 mm (44 in), compared to the standard platform height of 1,100 mm (43 in) for stations on the Senseki Line and 920 mm (36 in) for stations on the Tohoku Main Line.

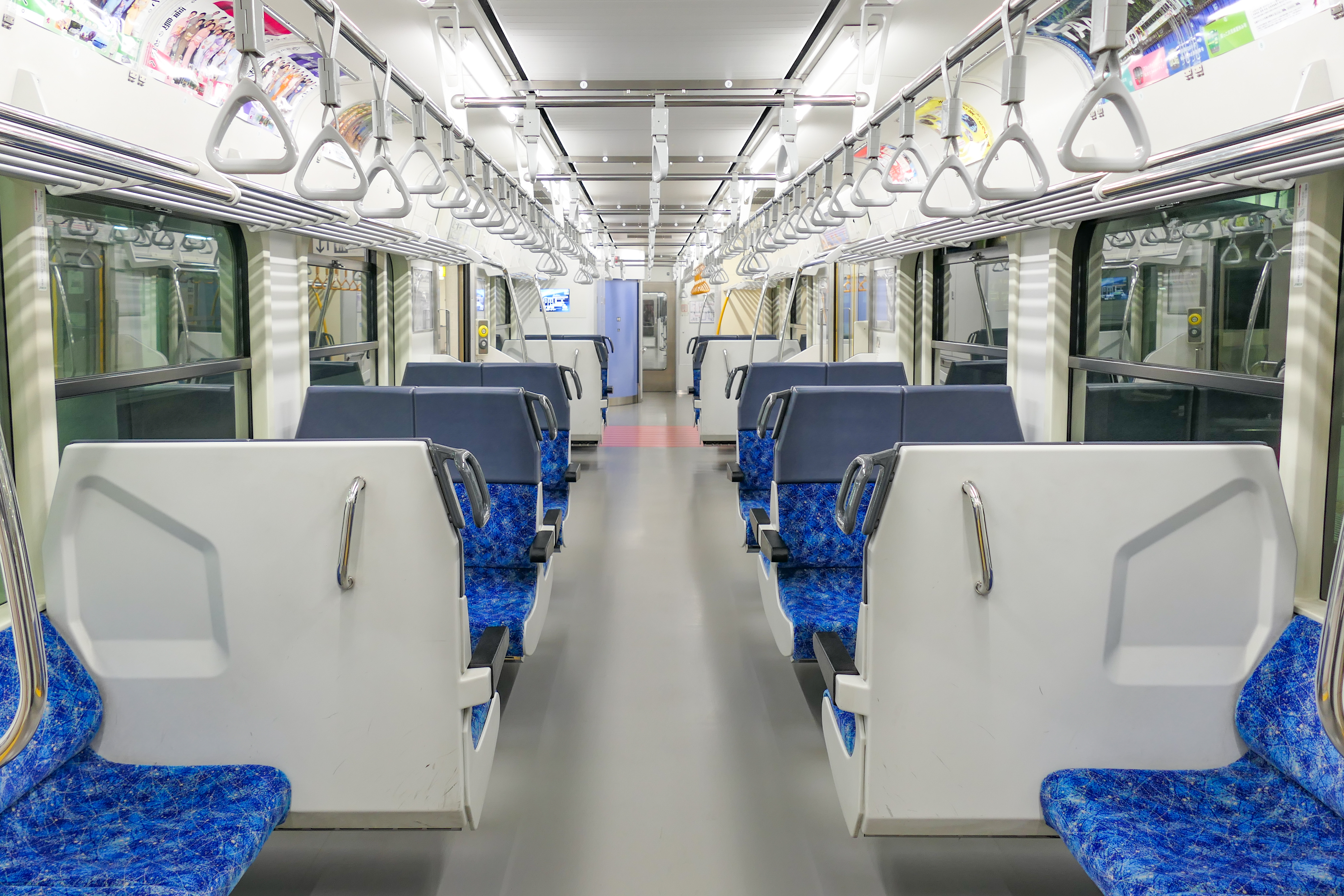
View of the interior, September 2021

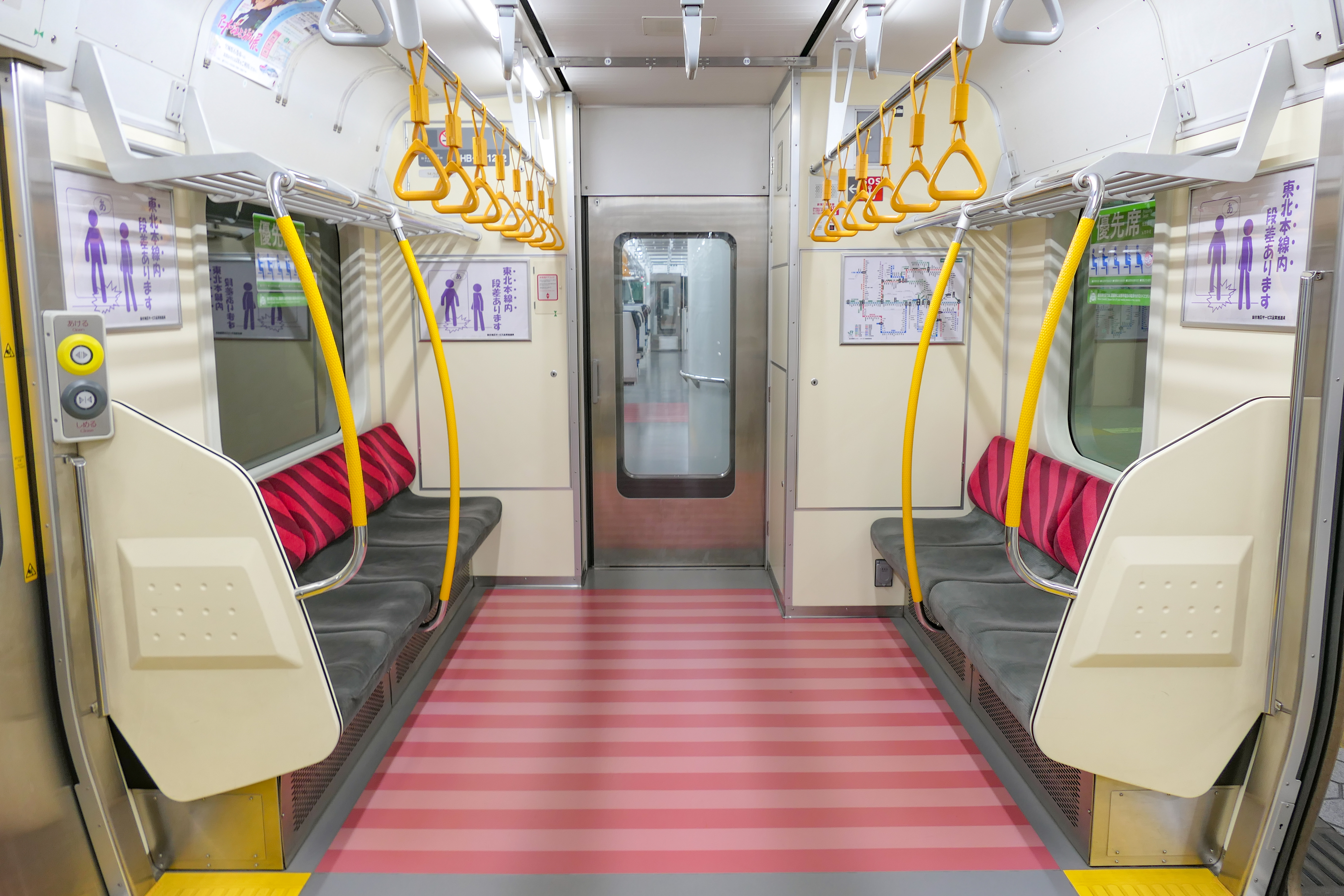
Priority seating, September 2021

== History ==
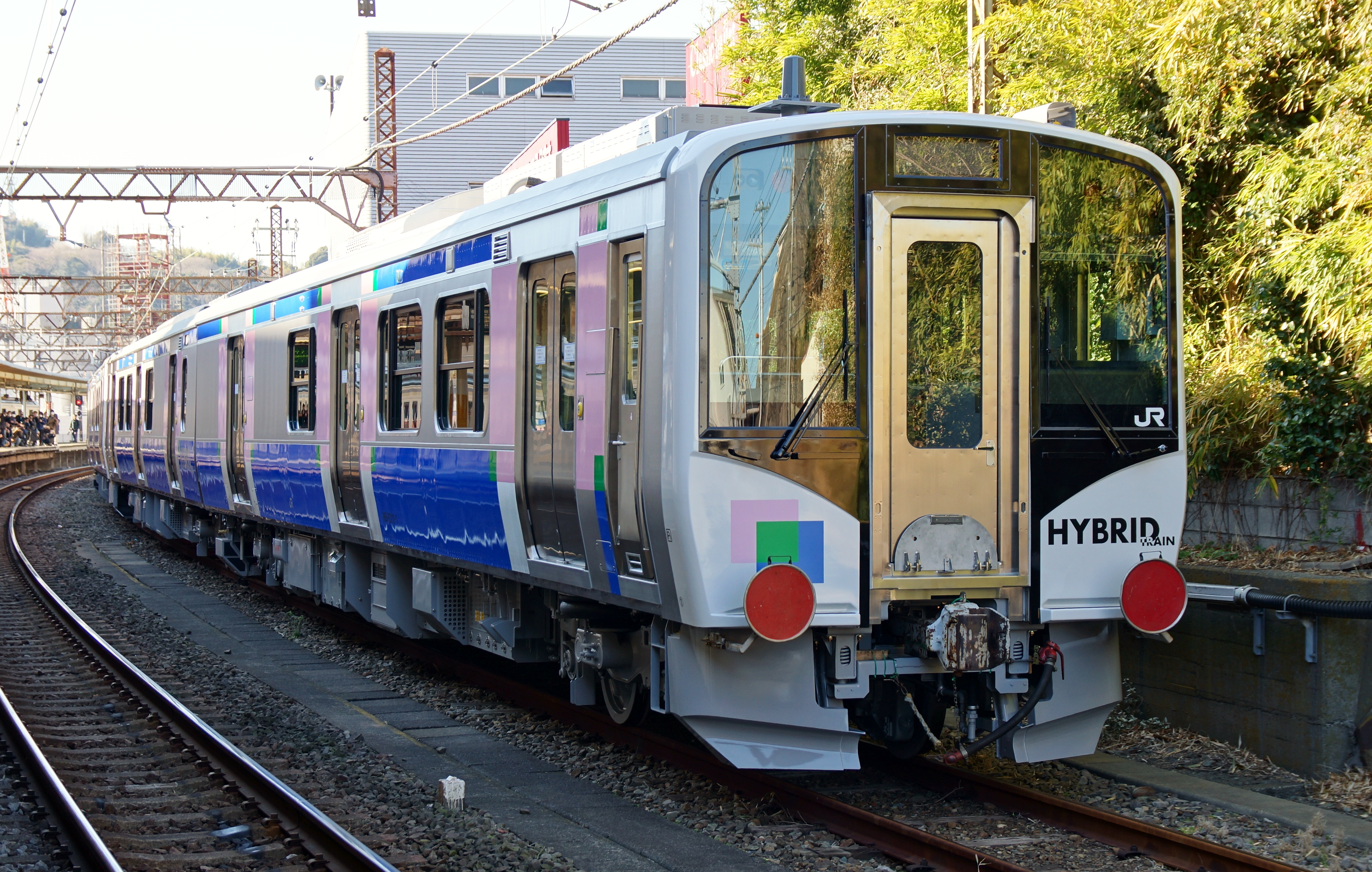
The first two sets, C-1 and C-2, on delivery from J-TREC in January 2015

The first two trains built by Japan Transport Engineering Company (J-TREC) in Yokohama were originally scheduled to be delivered in November 2014, but the delivery date was postponed until January 2015. Test running using the first two sets delivered commenced on 16 January 2015, on the Tohoku Main Line between Kogota and Sendai.

In May 2016, the HB-E210 series was awarded the 2016 Laurel Prize, presented annually by the Japan Railfan Club.

== Build details ==
The build histories of individual sets are as follows.

Set No.	Date delivered
C-1	January 2015
C-2	January 2015
C-3	February 2015
C-4	February 2015
C-5	March 2015
C-6	March 2015
C-7	March 2015
C-8	March 2015

== See also ==
- HB-E300 series, a similar hybrid DMU train type operated by JR East on resort train services
- YC1 series, a hybrid DMU train type operated by JR Kyushu from 2020
