= Compagnie des Chemins de Fer de Grande Banlieue =

Railway company

Compagnie des chemins de fer de Grande Banlieue (French pronunciation: [kɔ̃paɲi de ʃəmɛ̃ də fɛʁ də ɡʁɑ̃d bɑ̃ljø]) or CGB, was a railway company in the western suburban region of Paris, France, in the former département of Seine-et-Oise.

Despite efforts by the company, many of its lines never became profitable. It is the mass use of the automobile that gave the final blow to the CGB, buses took the passengers away from the lines onto irregular and non-direct bus lines. The tramway to Les Halles in Paris closed but the rails remained, plans were to run the trains from Pontoise via Poissy to Paris but residents close to Place de l'Étoile were against it, complaining about the noise of trains at night. Trains ran until 1933.

== Le tacot Pontoise-Poissy ==
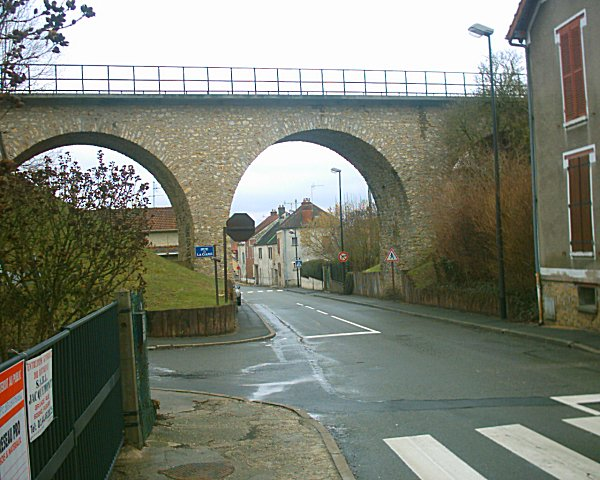
The light railway's bridge in Jouy-le-Moutier.

In 1912 was built a 1,435 mm (4 ft 8 1/2 in) railway line from Pontoise to Poissy. This line linked all the towns and villages along the River Oise to Andrésy and Poissy. The Chemins de fer du Département de Seine-et-Oise wished to link the lines from Paris with a circular line following the river, for technical and economic reasons, the line was built following the meandering river to prevent the building of tunnels and large viaducts. The line was always regarded as a tramway as some portions of the line ran on roads. The journey from Pontoise to Poissy took 1 hour and 20 minutes.

Passenger traffic was never the line's forte so the company tried to generate freight traffic to Paris. Vegetable farmers (maraîchers) transported their stock to Les Halles in Paris by connecting services.

Car and lorry transported killed the non-profitable line and it closed during 1929.

== Line openings ==
Opened	Section	Length (km)	Closed
	Versailles - Magny-en-Vexin / Pontoise		
1913	Versailles - Noisy-le-Roi	7	1938
1913	Noisy-le-Roi - Bouafle	31	1944
1912	Bouafle - Les Mureaux	4	1948
1912	Les Mureaux - Meulan	1	1944
1913	Meulan - Sagy	7	1947
1913	Sagy - Magny-en-Vexin	20	1949
1912	Sagy - Pontoise	15	1949
	Pontoise - Poissy		
1912	Gency (Pontoise) - Maurecourt	7	1939
1912	Maurecourt - Poissy	9	1934
	Saint-Germain-en-Laye - Bouafle		
1912	Saint-Germain-Bertaux - Saint-Germain-Péreire	3	1937
1912	St Germain-Péreire - Bouafle	16	1948
	Arpajon - Corbeil		
1911	Arpajon - Étampes-Jeu-de-Paume	30	1948
1912	Étampes-Jeu-de-Paume - Maisse	21	1949
1912	Maisse - Milly-la-Forêt	7	1953
1912	Milly-la-Forêt - Corbeil-Essonnes	26	1949
1912	Étampes-Jeu-de-Paume - Saint-Martin	2	1914
1921	Bouville - La Ferté-Alais	9	1948

== Network ==
Most of the CGB's lines connected with main lines owned by Chemins de Fer de l'Ouest, linking important towns through valleys.
