= JR Freight Class HD300 =

Japanese locomotive type

Class HD300
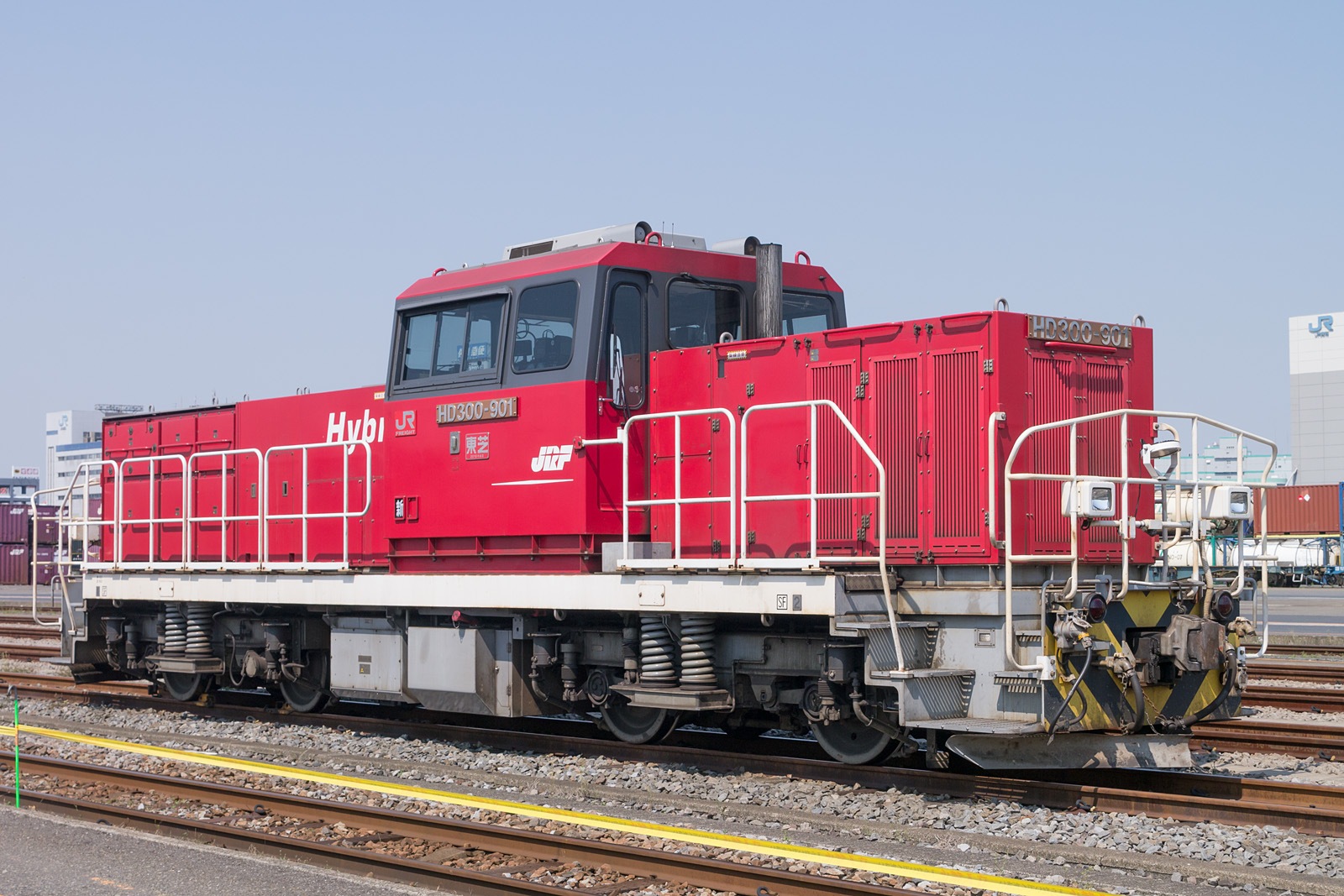
- Prototype HD300-901 at Tokyo Freight Terminal in May 2013
Type and origin
- Power type: Hybrid diesel/battery
- Builder: Toshiba
- Build date: 2010–
Specifications
- Configuration
  - UIC: Bo′Bo′
- Gauge: 1,067 mm (3 ft 6 in)
- Length: 14,300 mm (46 ft 11 in)
- Axle load: 15 t (15 long tons; 17 short tons)
- Loco weight: 60 t (59 long tons; 66 short tons)
Performance figures
- Maximum speed: 110 km/h (70 mph)
- Power output: 500 kW (670 hp)
Career
- Operators: JR Freight
- Number in class: 32 (as of February 2018)
- Delivered: March 2010
- Disposition: In service

The Class HD300 (HD300形) is a hybrid diesel/battery Bo-Bo wheel arrangement switcher locomotive type operated by Japan Freight Railway Company (JR Freight) in Japan. Following the delivery and evaluation of a prototype locomotive in March 2010, the first full-production locomotive entered service in February 2012.

== Variants ==
- Class HD300-0: Standard type, entering service from February 2012
- Class HD300-500: Sub-class designed for operation in cold-climate conditions, delivered from November 2014
- Class HD300-900: Prototype locomotive delivered in March 2010

== Design ==
The locomotives use lithium ion batteries, and are designed to reduce exhaust emissions by at least 30% to 40% and noise levels by at least 10 dB compared with existing Class DE10 diesel locomotives. Tests conducted at Tokyo Freight Terminal in June 2010 demonstrated fuel savings of 36%, NOx emission reductions of 62%, and noise level reductions of 22 dB compared with a class DE10 locomotive. Externally, the locomotives are finished in a bright red livery to aid visibility, with yellow and black diagonal warning stripes at the ends.

The first full-production locomotive, HD300-1, delivered in January 2012, while broadly identical to the prototype HD300-901 locomotive, incorporates a few minor improvements, including changes to the headlamps, a wider front-end warning panel to reduce snow build-up on the steps, and larger windows in the driving cab doors to improve visibility.

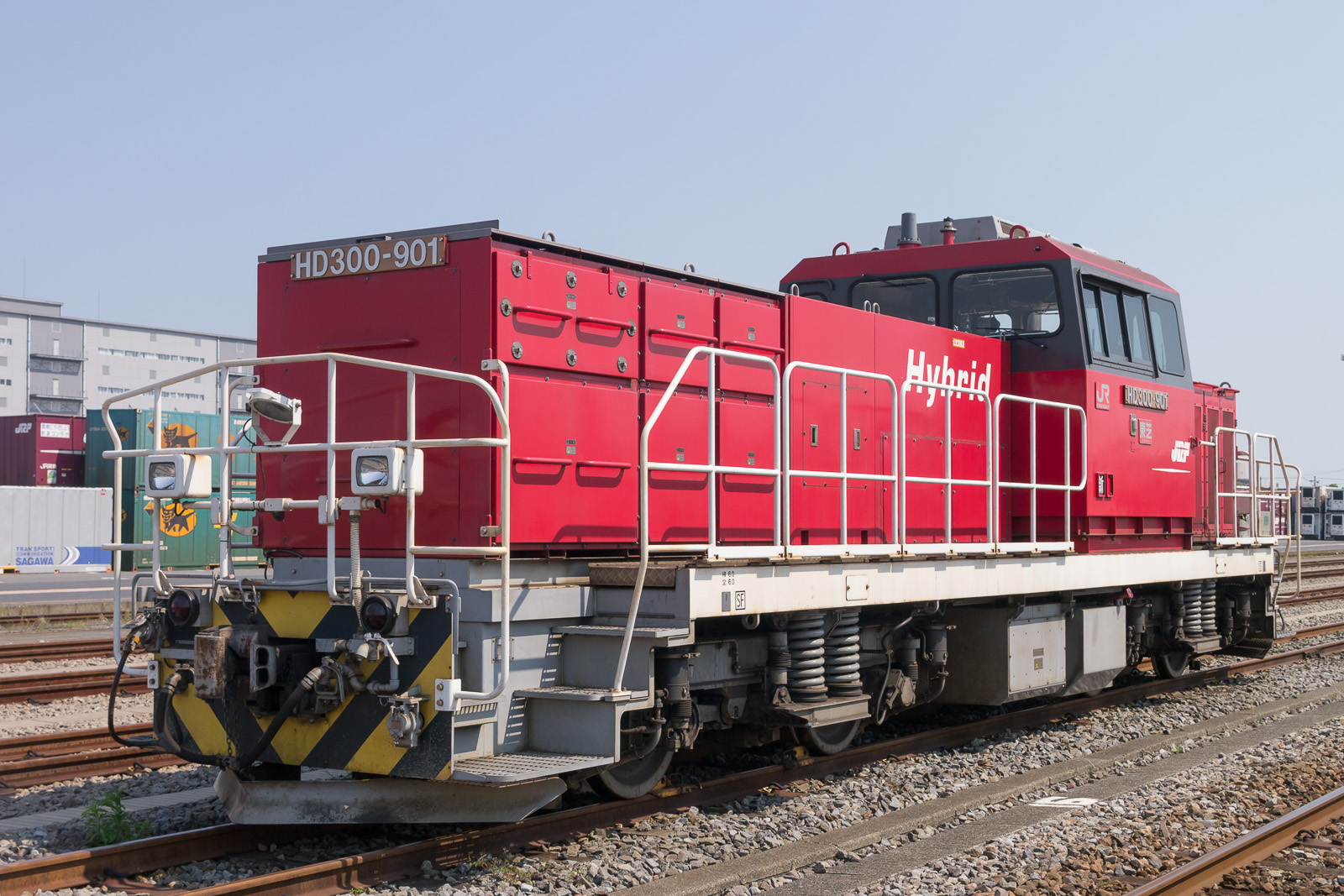
No. 1 end of prototype HD300-901 in May 2013

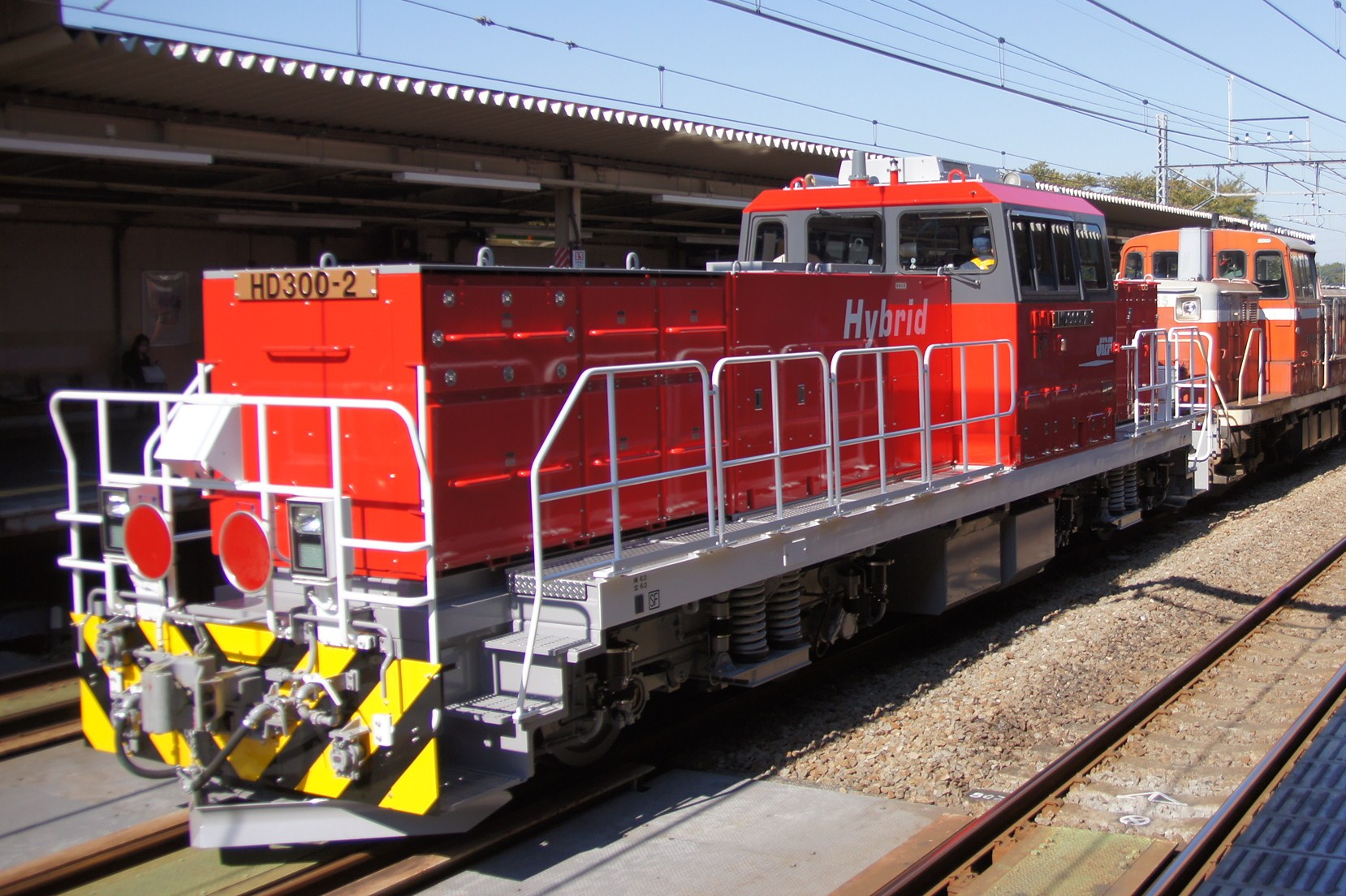
No. 1 end of full-production loco HD300-2 on delivery in October 2012

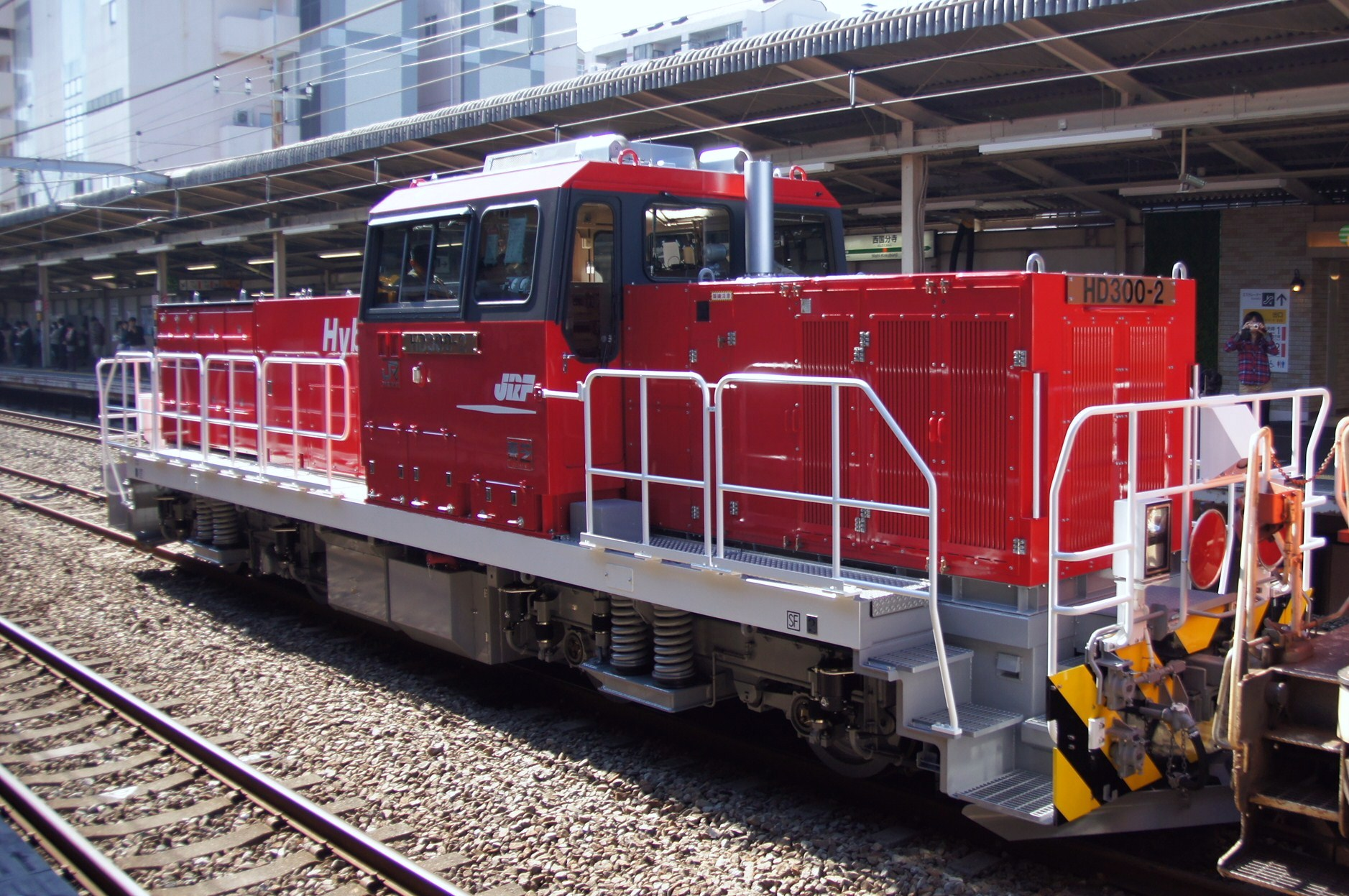
No. 2 end of full-production loco HD300-2 on delivery in October 2012

== History ==
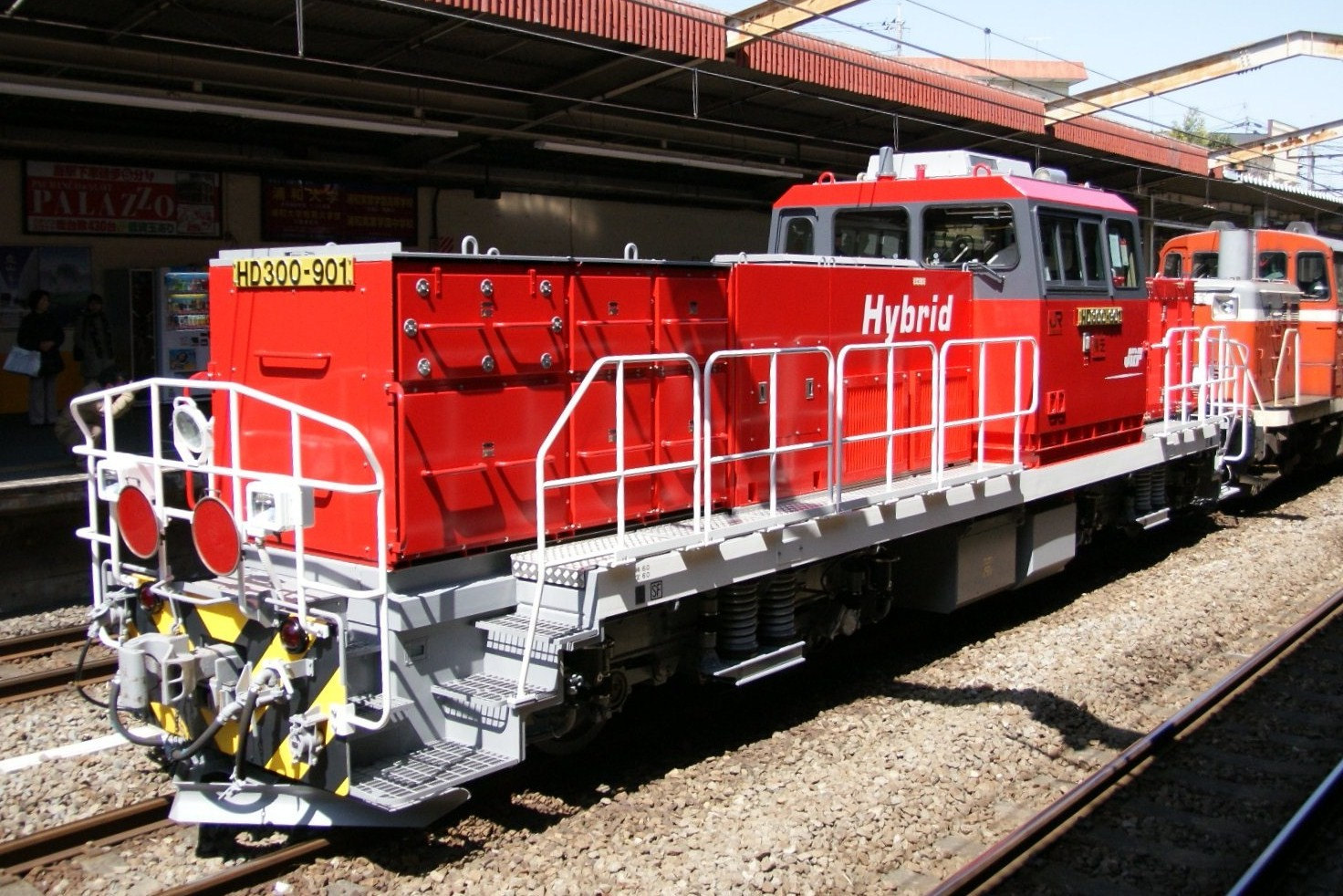
Prototype HD300-901 on delivery from Toshiba in March 2010

The prototype locomotive, HD300-901, was delivered from the Toshiba factory in Fuchū, Tokyo to Tokyo Freight Terminal on 30 March 2010 for approximately six months of trials before being moved to Matsumoto in Nagano Prefecture later in the year to assess performance at higher altitudes. The locomotive was moved to Sapporo Freight Terminal in Hokkaido in January 2011 to assess battery performance and adhesion in cold winter conditions.

The prototype locomotive entered revenue service from 11 July 2011, on shunting operations at Tokyo Freight Terminal.

The first full-production locomotive (numbered HD300-1) was delivered from the Toshiba factory in Fuchū, Tokyo, in January 2012, and entered service at Tokyo Freight Terminal from 8 February.

In May 2012, the Class HD300-900 prototype was awarded the 2012 Laurel Prize, presented annually by the Japan Railfan Club. A formal presentation ceremony was held at Tokyo Freight Terminal on 18 November 2012.

In November 2014, the first Class HD300-500 locomotive, HD300-501, designed for operations in cold-climate areas, was delivered to Naebo Depot in Hokkaido.

== Fleet list ==
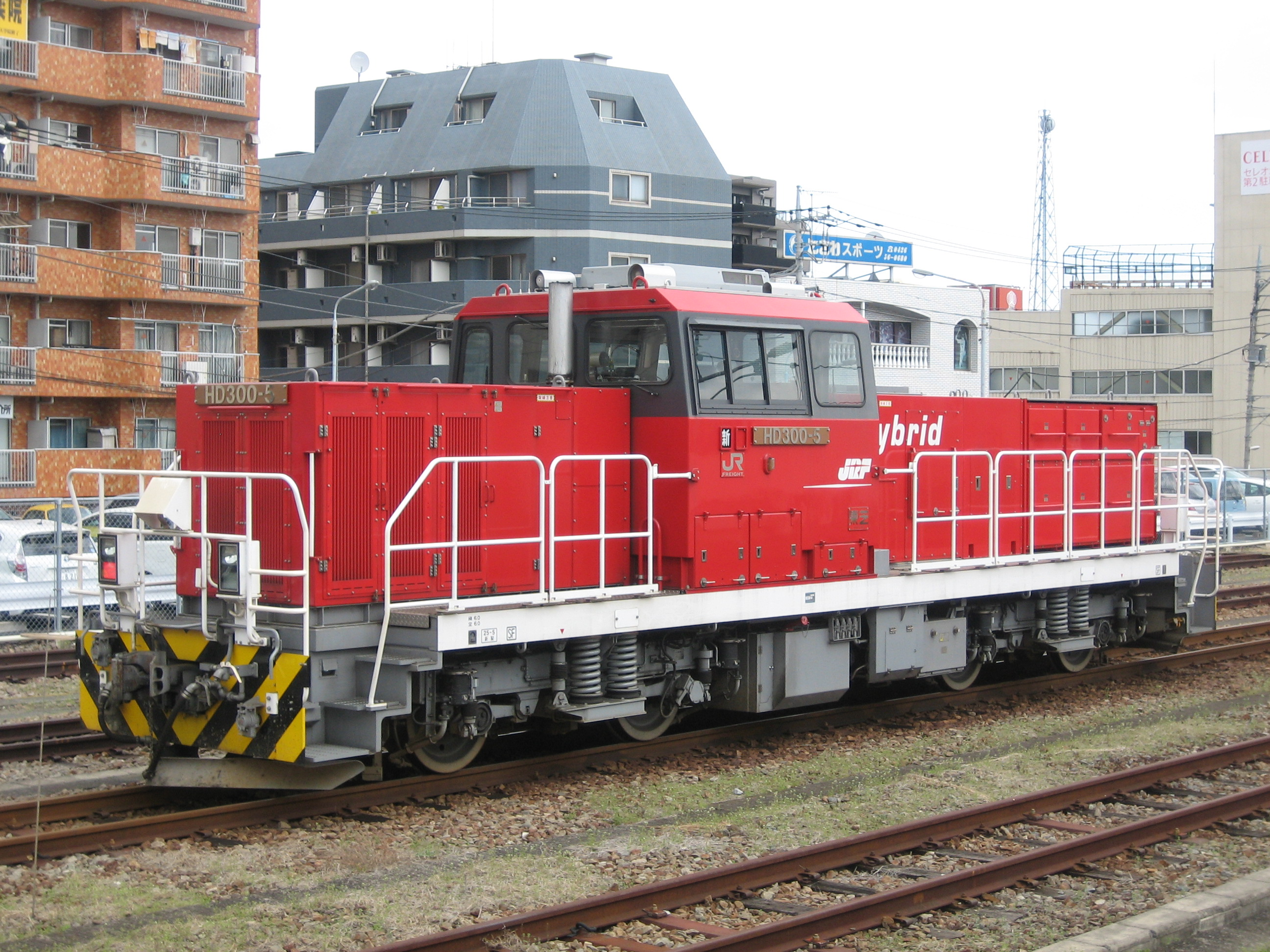
HD300-5 at Hachioji Station in April 2014

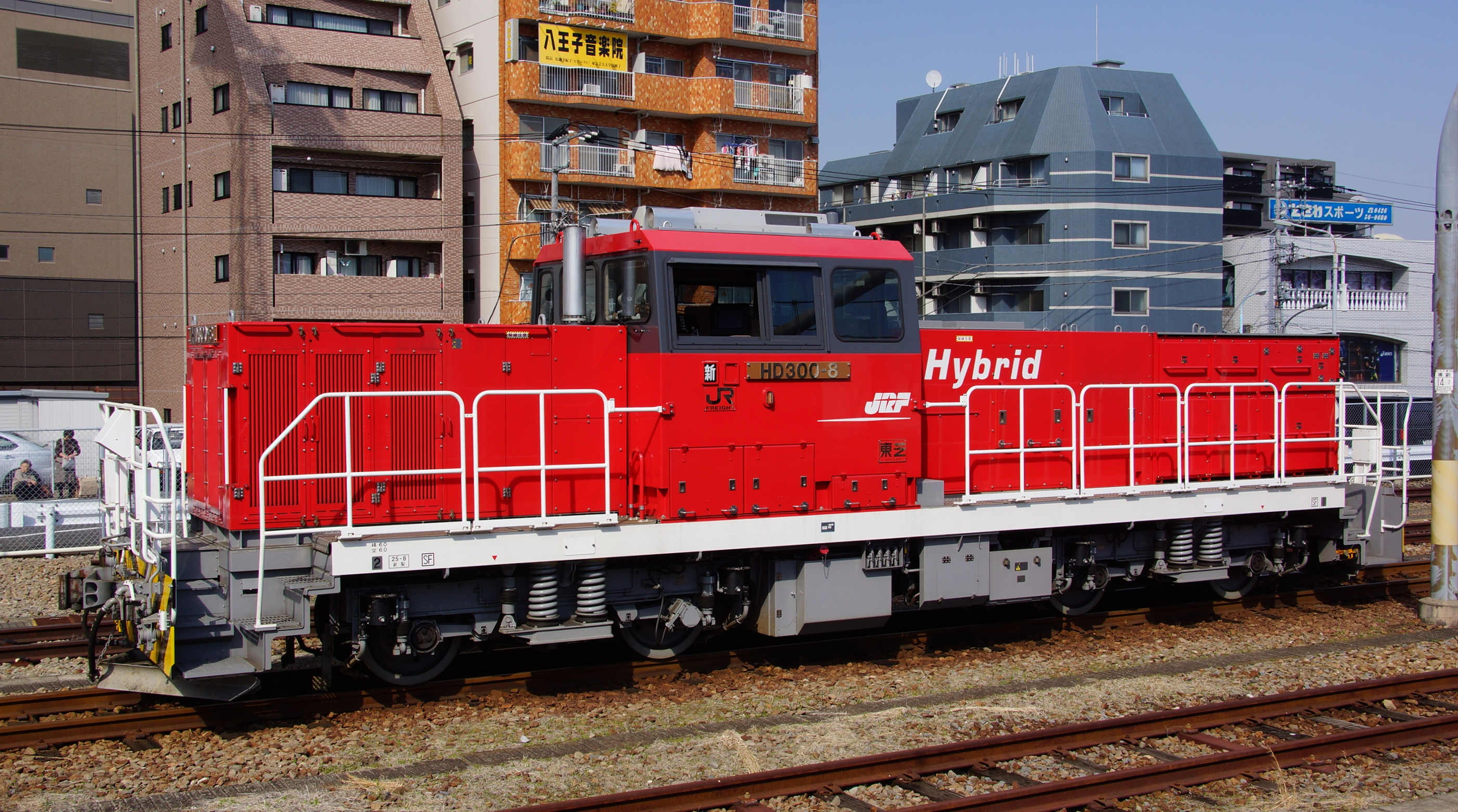
HD300-8 at Hachioji Station in March 2014

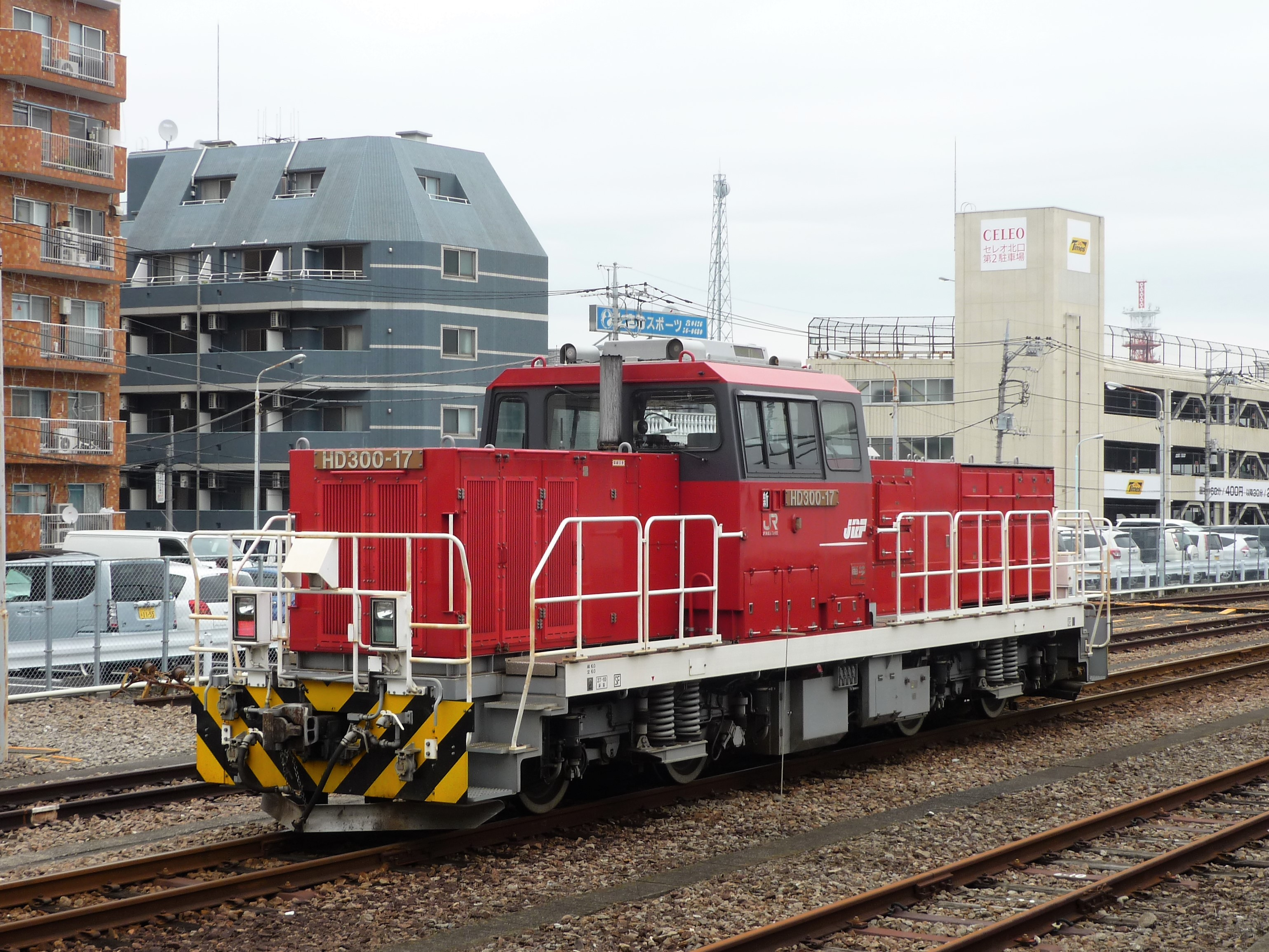
HD300-17 at Hachioji Station in October 2017

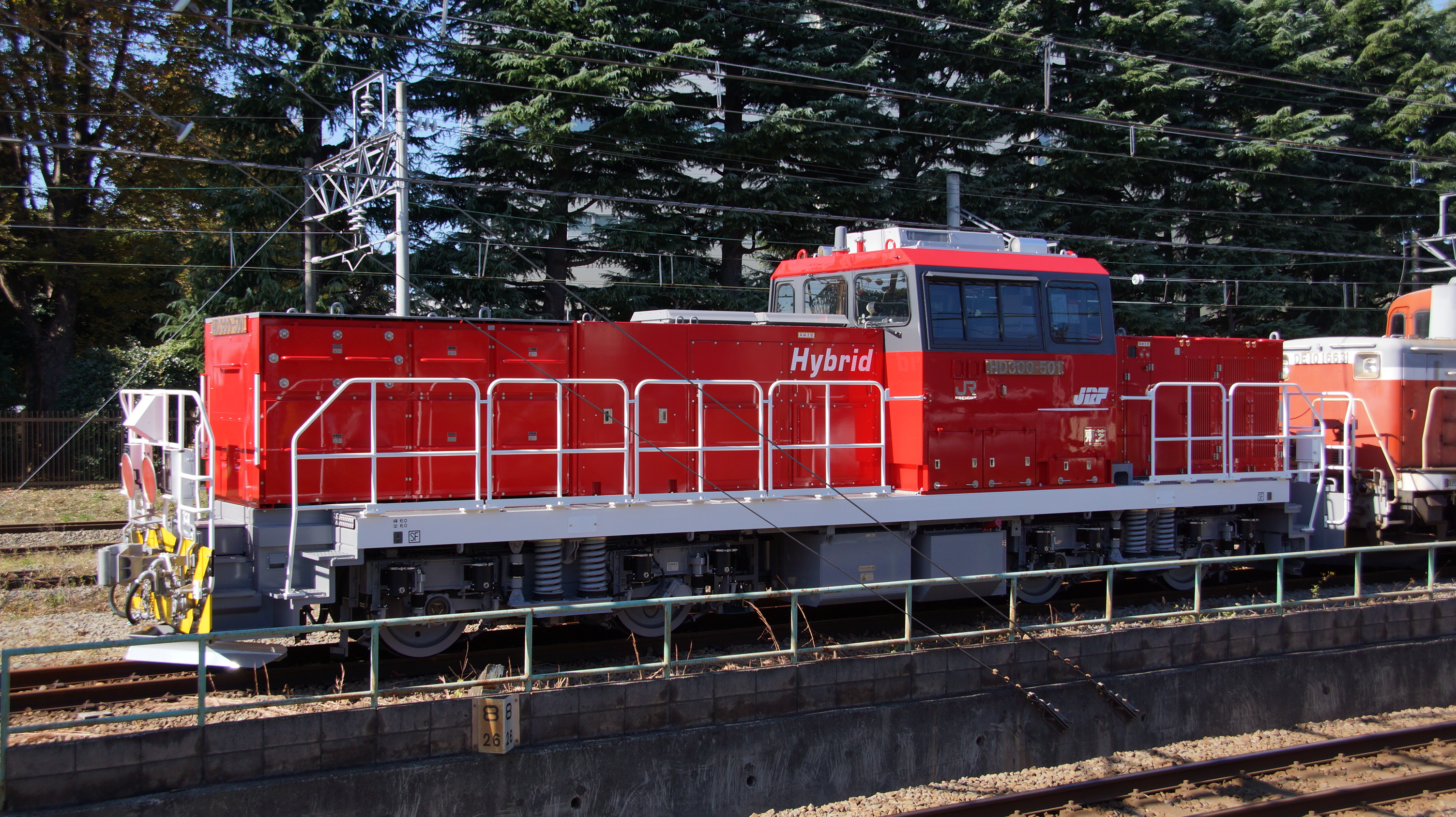
HD300-501 on delivery in November 2014

As of 1 March 2017, 29 Class HD300 locomotives are in service.

Number	Manufacturer	Date delivered	Remarks
HD300-901	Toshiba	30 March 2010	Prototype
HD300-1	Toshiba	17 January 2012	Full-production locomotives
HD300-2	Toshiba	26 October 2012	Full-production locomotives
HD300-3	Toshiba	13 November 2012	Full-production locomotives
HD300-4	Toshiba	13 December 2012	Full-production locomotives
HD300-5	Toshiba	30 May 2013	Full-production locomotives
HD300-6	Toshiba	20 June 2013	Full-production locomotives
HD300-7	Toshiba		Full-production locomotives
HD300-8	Toshiba	29 August 2013	Full-production locomotives
HD300-9	Toshiba	29 August 2013	Full-production locomotives
HD300-10	Toshiba		Full-production locomotives
HD300-11	Toshiba	31 October 2013	Full-production locomotives
HD300-12	Toshiba	31 October 2013	Full-production locomotives
HD300-13	Toshiba	21 November 2013	Full-production locomotives
HD300-14	Toshiba	12 December 2013	Full-production locomotives
HD300-15	Toshiba	9 January 2014	Full-production locomotives
HD300-16	Toshiba	April 2014	Full-production locomotives
HD300-17	Toshiba	October 2015	Full-production locomotives
HD300-18	Toshiba	November 2015	Full-production locomotives
HD300-19	Toshiba	December 2015	Full-production locomotives
HD300-20	Toshiba	January 2016	Full-production locomotives
HD300-21	Toshiba	October 2016	Full-production locomotives
HD300-22	Toshiba	October 2016	Full-production locomotives
HD300-23	Toshiba	November 2016	Full-production locomotives
HD300-24	Toshiba	December 2016	Full-production locomotives
HD300-25	Toshiba	January 2017	Full-production locomotives
HD300-26	Toshiba	December 2017	Full-production locomotives
HD300-27	Toshiba	January 2018	Full-production locomotives
HD300-28	Toshiba	February 2018	Full-production locomotives
HD300-501	Toshiba	November 2014	Cold-climate type
HD300-502	Toshiba	November 2014	Cold-climate type
HD300-503	Toshiba	December 2014	Cold-climate type

== Classification ==
The HD300 classification for this locomotive type is explained below. As with previous locomotive designs, the prototype is numbered HD300-901, with subsequent production locomotives numbered from HD300-1 onward.

- H – hybrid locomotive
- D – four driving axles
- 300 – synchronous motors
