= Sagy, Val-d'Oise =

Sagy
- Commune
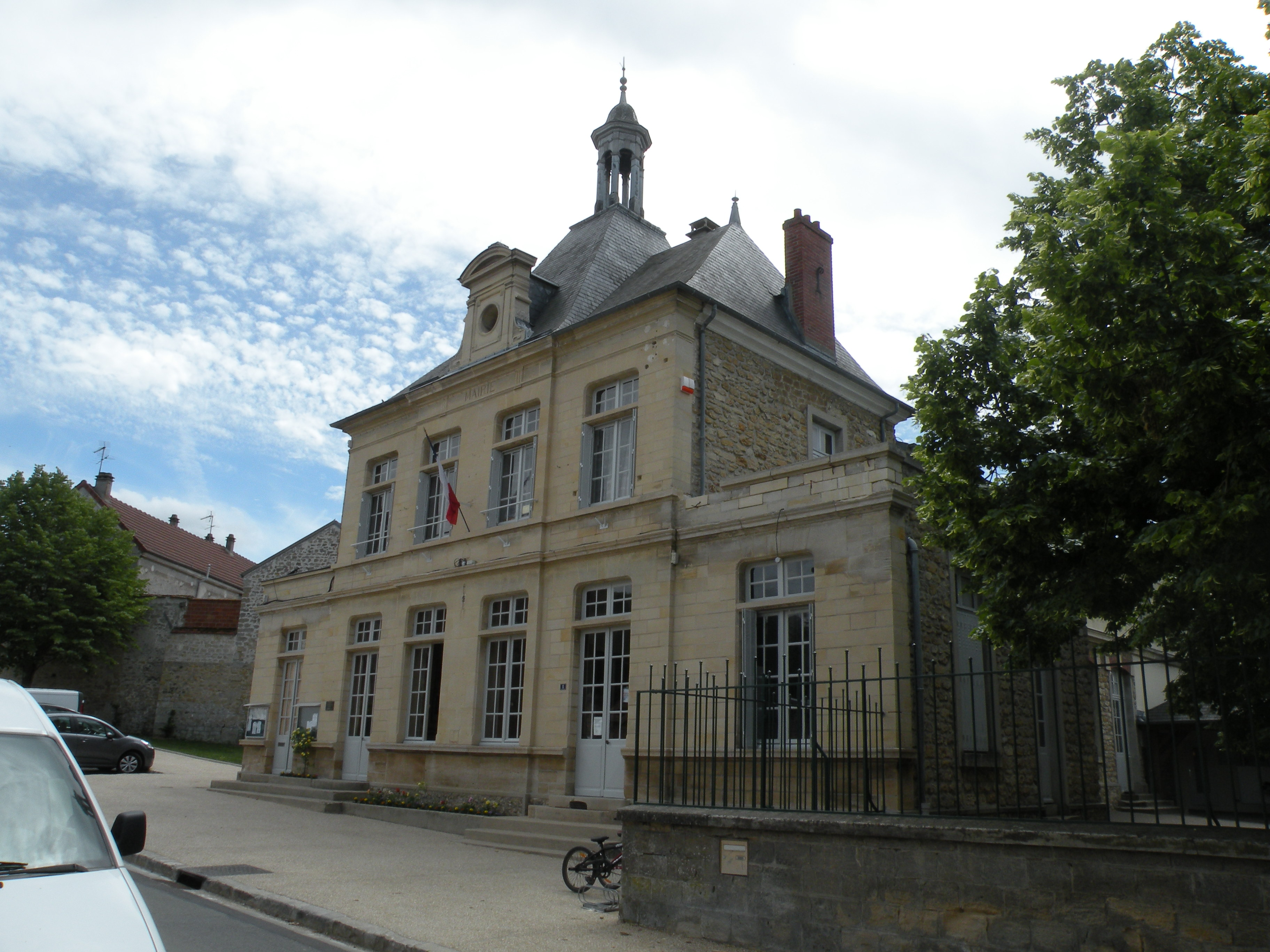
- The town hall of Sagy

- Coat of arms
- Location of Sagy
- Location within France Location within Île-de-France (region)
- Coordinates: 49°03′02″N 1°57′10″E
- Country: France
- Region: Île-de-France
- Department: Val-d'Oise
- Arrondissement: Pontoise
- Canton: Vauréal

Government
  - Mayor (2020–2026): Guy Paris
- Area^{1}: 10.53 km^{2} (4.07 sq mi)
- Highest elevation: 130 m (430 ft)
- Lowest elevation: 42 m (138 ft)
- Population (2023): 1,096
  - Density: 104.1/km^{2} (269.6/sq mi)
- Time zone: UTC+01:00 (CET)
  - Summer (DST): UTC+02:00 (CEST)
- INSEE/Postal code: 95535 /95450
- ^{1} French Land Register data, which excludes lakes, ponds, glaciers > 1 km^{2} (0.386 sq mi or 247 acres) and river estuaries.

Sagy (French pronunciation: [saʒi]) is a commune in the Val-d'Oise department and Île-de-France region of France.

== See also ==
- Communes of the Val-d'Oise department
