= Patton Motor Company =

Rolling stock manufacturer

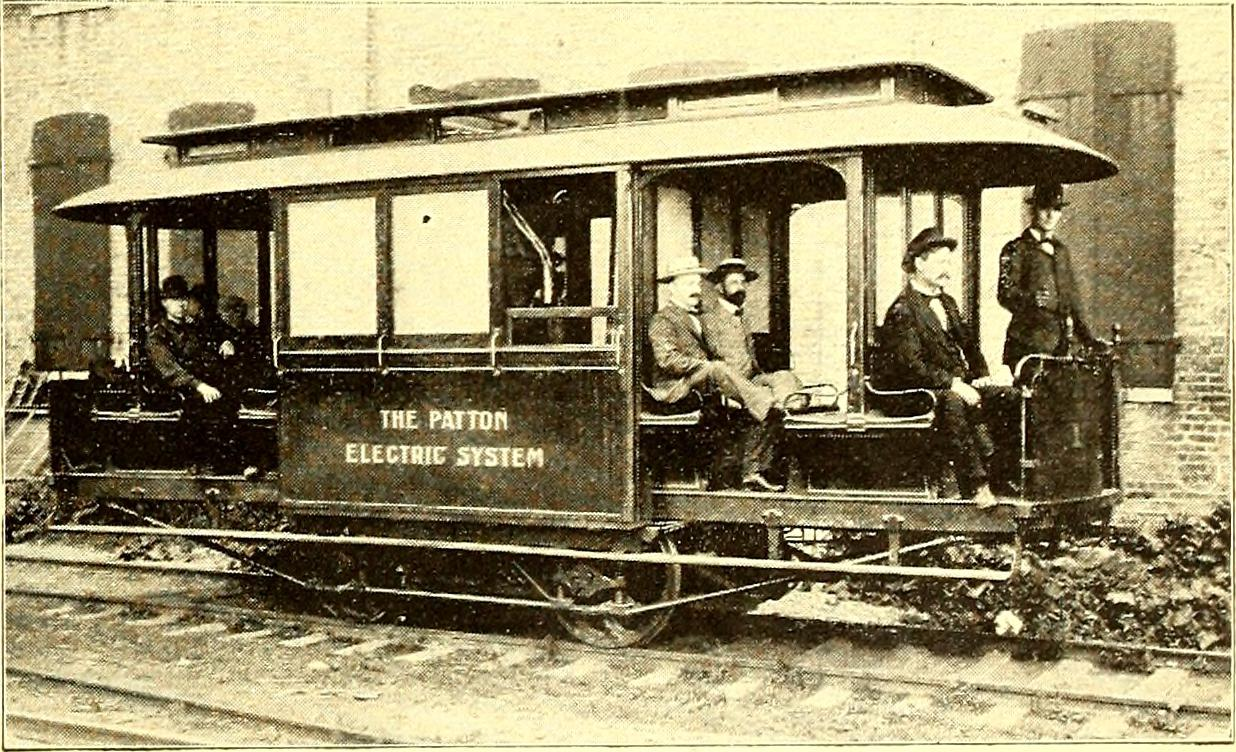
The Patton Electric System

The Patton Motor Company was a street car manufacturer in Chicago.

== History ==
The Patton Motor Company was based in 340 and 342 Dearborn St., Chicago, where it manufactured around 1898 patented electric street cars. These were used as a feeder for trolley lines, for nightwork or for long distance work. They were particularly adapted for service where, because of operating expense, the trolley equipment was unsatisfactory. They required no poles, no wires, no power house, no bonding of rails but only ordinary track. The company guaranteed to provide street car service under average conditions for less than two cents per car mile for power.

A gasoline engine was used to drive a dynamo, which in turn operated the electric motor. The principal claim of the inventor was the use of a storage battery, which accumulated the power of the dynamo, when on a down grade, or at rest, and which was automatically connected in to assist when the work was heavy.

The gasoline was stored in a tank in the roof of the car. The tank capacity of 23 gallons (87 litres) was sufficient for 150 miles (240 km). During a trial run at Racine, Wisconsin on 8 July 1896 over the line of the Chicago, Milwaukee, St. Paul & Pacific Railroad the car attained at times speeds of 25 miles per hour (40 km/h) and surmounted grades of up to 55 feet to the mile (10%) without difficulty beyond perceptibly slowing down.

The motor cars were used as a smoking car and motor at the Chattagnooga Rapid Transit Company and as an independent motor by the Cedar Falls (Iowa) & Normal Railway. A combination double truck car was also on offer.
