= YC1 series =

Japanese train type

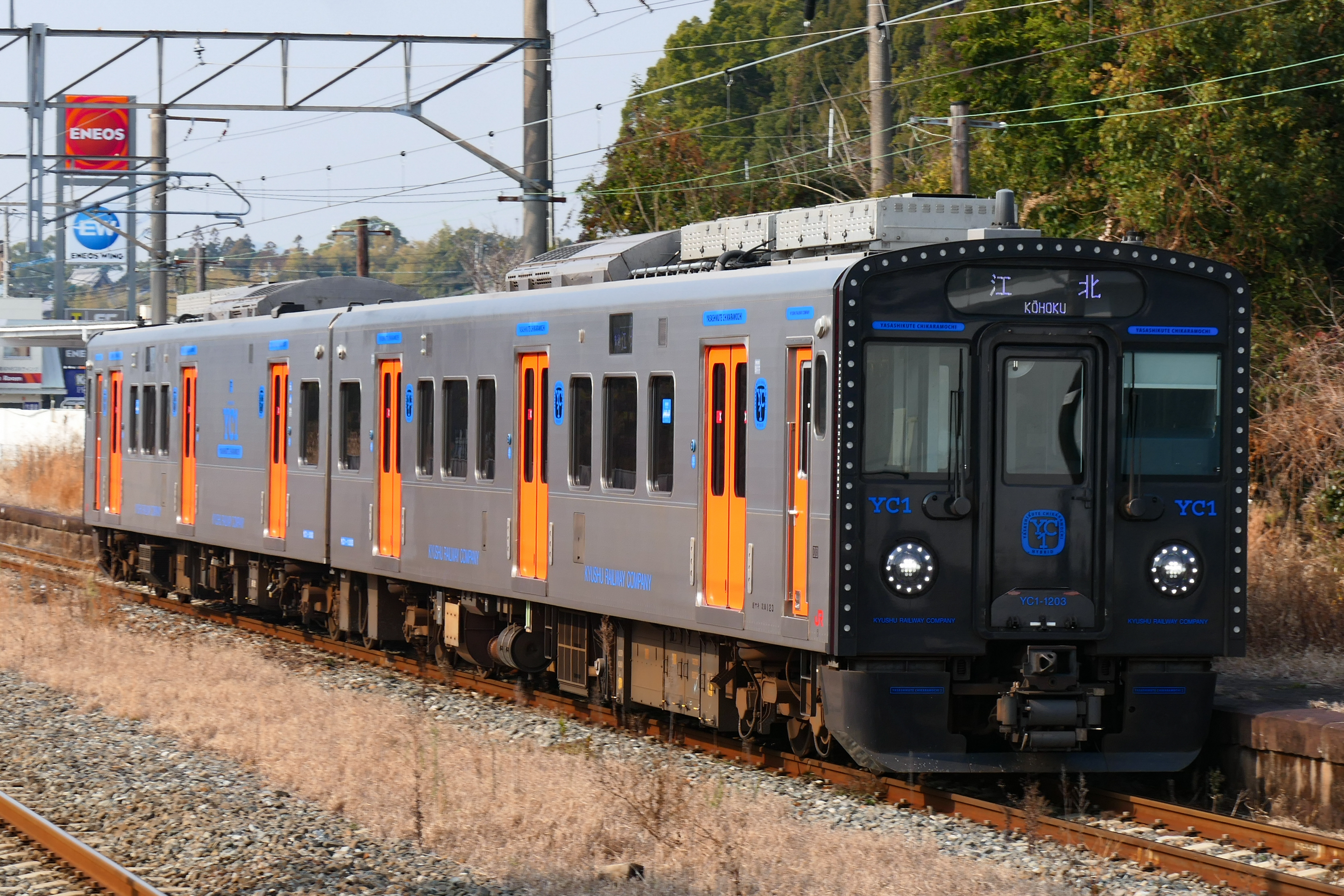
- YC1 series train in January 2023
- Manufacturer: Kawasaki Heavy Industries
- Built at: Hyōgo
- Family name: hybrid efACE
- Replaced: KiHa 66/67
- Constructed: 2018–
- Entered service: 14 March 2020
- Number in service: 32 vehicles (as of November 2020)
- Formation: 2 cars per trainset
- Capacity: 232 (76 seated)
- Operator: JR Kyushu
- Depot: Sasebo
- Lines served: Nagasaki Main Line; Omura Line; Sasebo Line

Specifications
- Car body construction: Stainless steel
- Doors: 3 pairs per side
- Maximum speed: 110 km/h (68 mph)
- Track gauge: 1,067 mm (3 ft 6 in)

The YC1 series (YC1系) is a hybrid diesel-electric multiple unit (DMU) train type operated by Kyushu Railway Company (JR Kyushu) in Japan since 14 March 2020. One two-car train was delivered in June 2018 for testing in preparation for full production and entry into revenue service.

== Interior ==
The interior features LED lighting and four-language passenger information displays. Seating consists of a mix of longitudinal seating and seating bays.

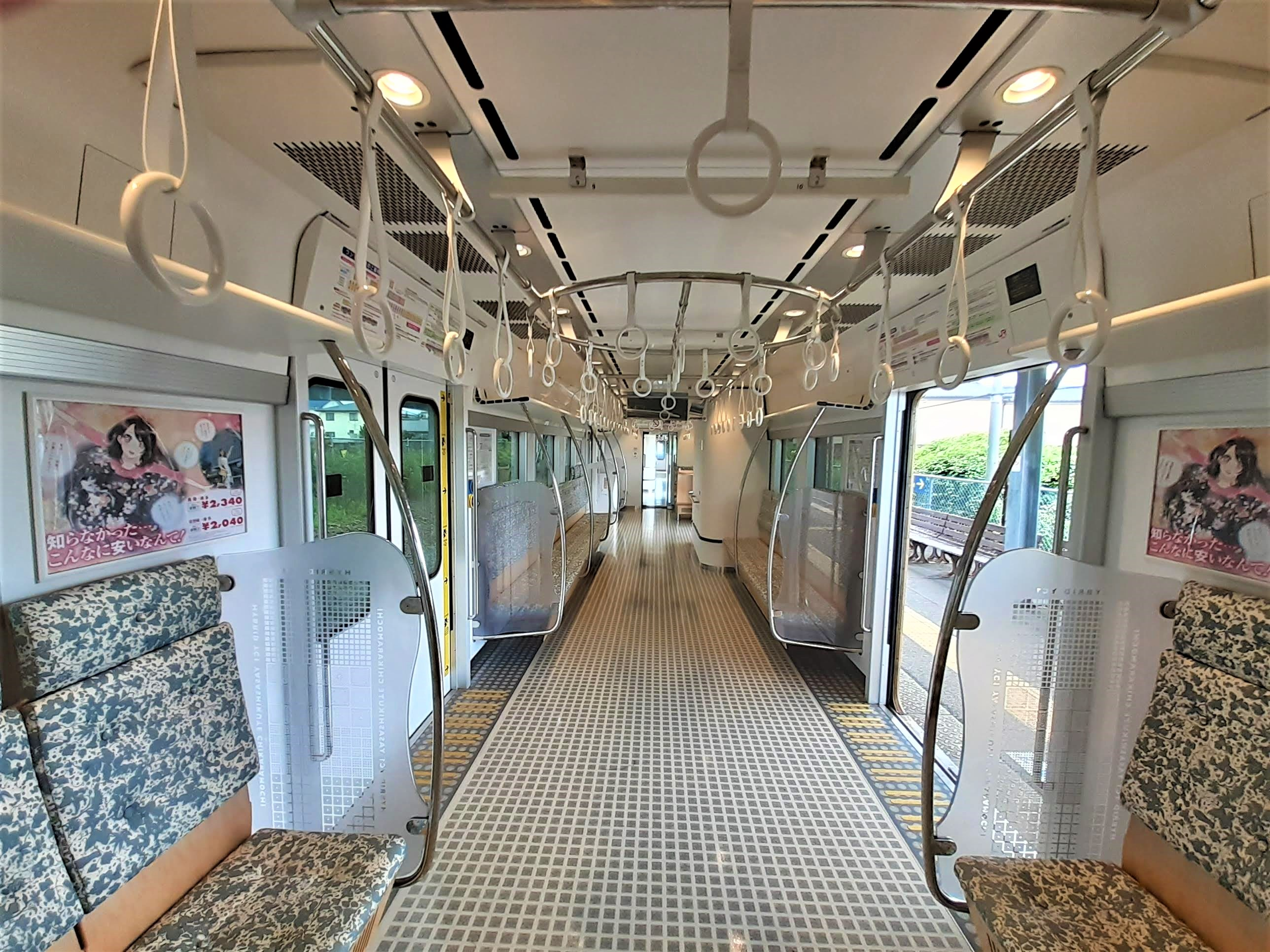
Interior

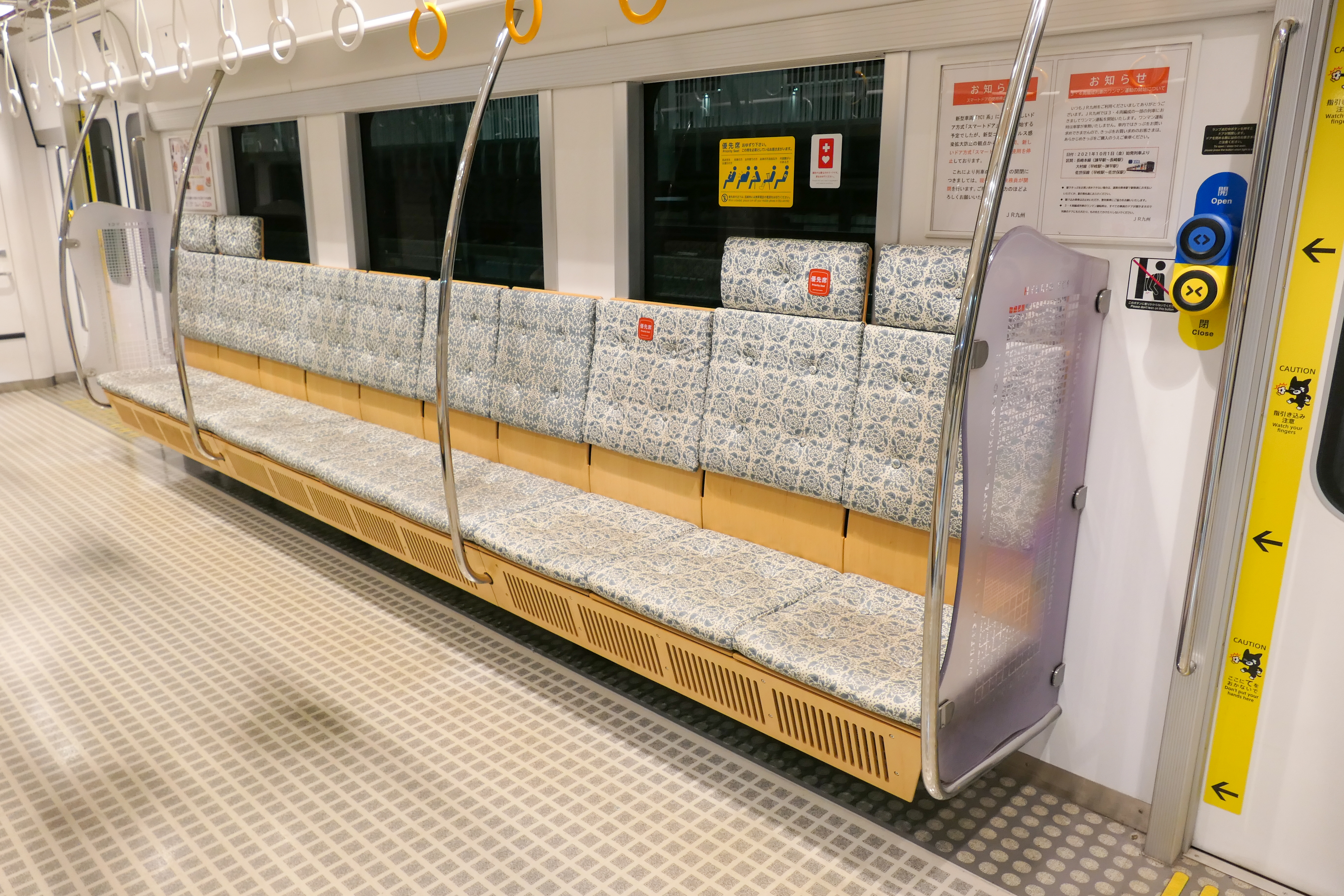
Longitudinal seating

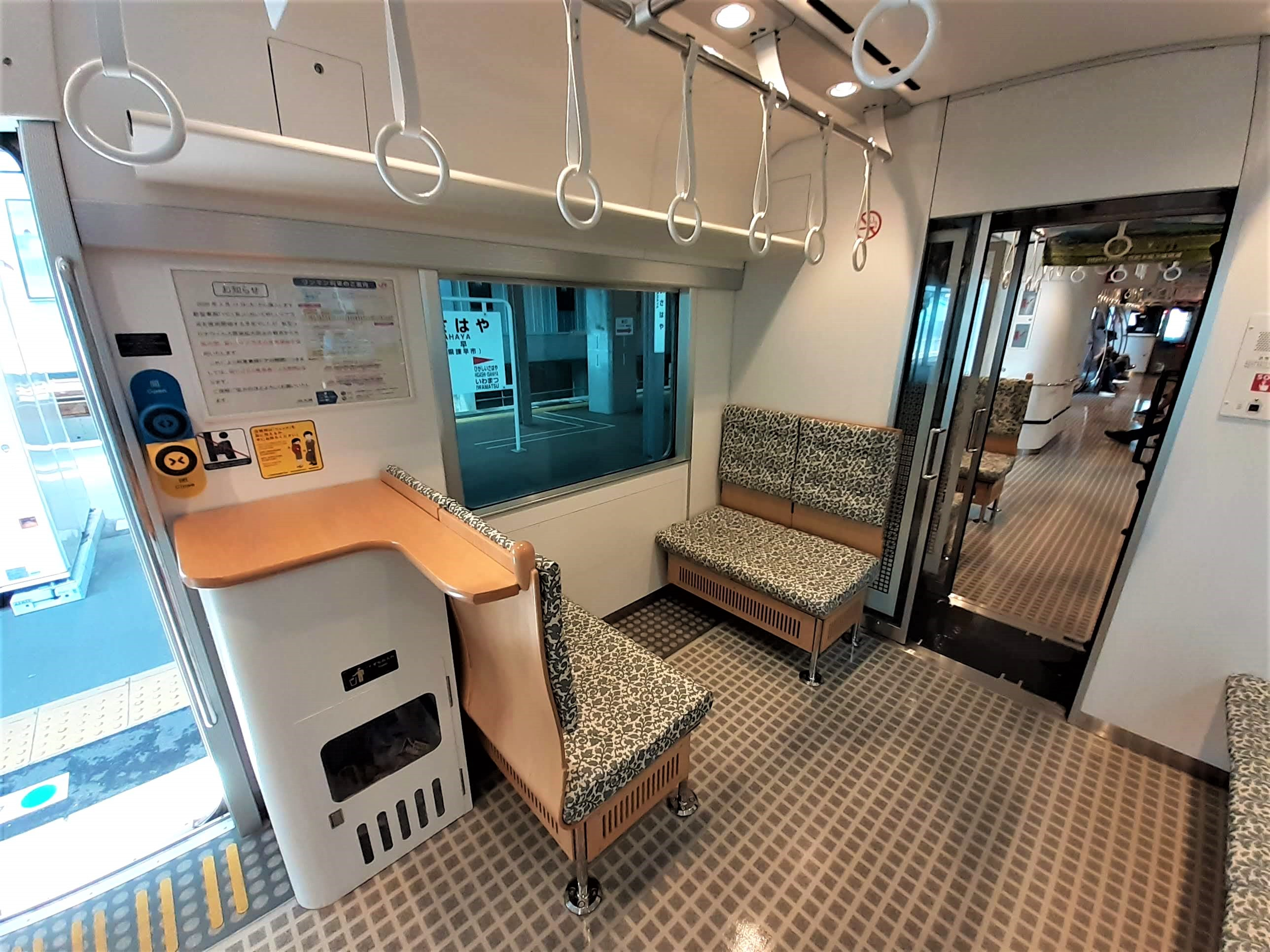
Transverse seating bay

== Technical specifications ==
The car bodies are made out of stainless steel. The train is equipped with a storage battery, which can be charged with the regenerated power from braking. JR Kyushu reports that the hybrid system consumes 20% less fuel than the diesel-hydraulic KiHa 66 and 67 trains, which were envisaged to be replaced by the YC1 series.

== History ==
The first set, a 2-car set, was delivered in June 2018, and is based at Sasebo depot. The set was used in a test run on the Nagasaki Main Line and Sasebo Line in March 2019. Revenue service began on 14 March 2020. Throughout 2020, twenty-four YC1 series cars were delivered from Kawasaki Heavy Industries' Hyogo plant.

Since 23 September 2022, a majority of Nagasaki Main Line local and rapid services have been operated using YC1 series trains.
