= Bouafle =

- Commune
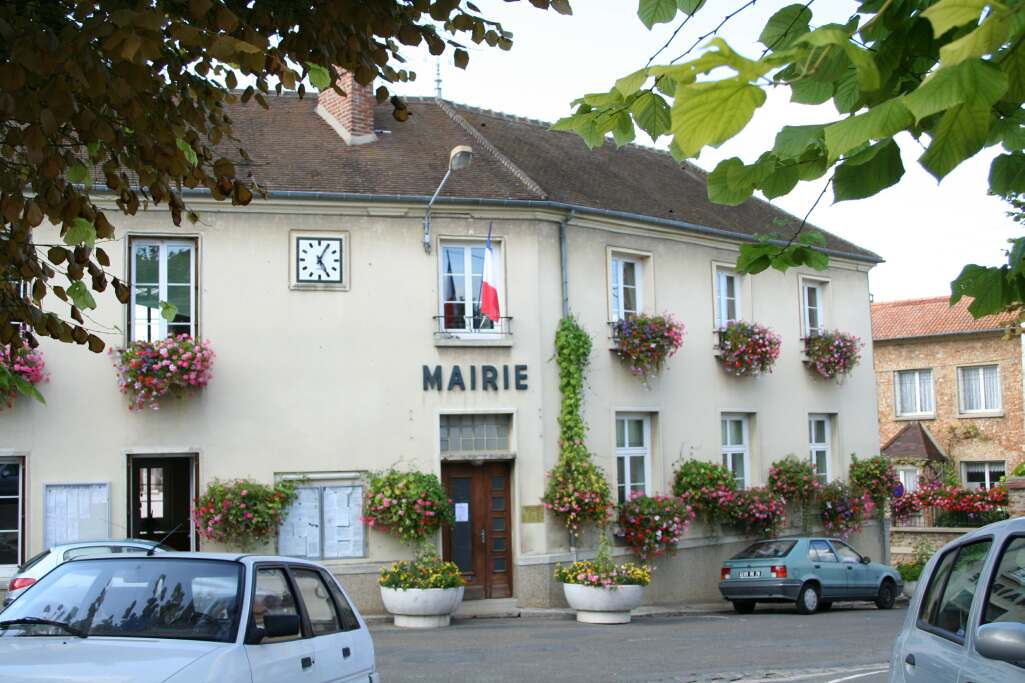
- Town hall

- Coat of arms
- Location of Bouafle
- Location within France Location within Île-de-France (region)
- Coordinates: 48°57′54″N 1°53′49″E
- Country: France
- Region: Île-de-France
- Department: Yvelines
- Arrondissement: Mantes-la-Jolie
- Canton: Aubergenville
- Intercommunality: CU Grand Paris Seine et Oise

Government
  - Mayor (2020–2026): Sabine Olivier
- Area^{1}: 6.92 km^{2} (2.67 sq mi)
- Elevation: 85 m (279 ft)
- Highest elevation: 179 m (587 ft)
- Lowest elevation: 31 m (102 ft)
- Population (2023): 2,234
  - Density: 323/km^{2} (836/sq mi)
- Time zone: UTC+01:00 (CET)
  - Summer (DST): UTC+02:00 (CEST)
- INSEE/Postal code: 78090 /78410
- ^{1} French Land Register data, which excludes lakes, ponds, glaciers > 1 km^{2} (0.386 sq mi or 247 acres) and river estuaries.

Bouafle (French pronunciation: [bwafl]) is a commune in the Yvelines department in north-central France.

== Population ==
Historical population
Year	Pop.	±% p.a.
1968	1,731	—
1975	2,104	+2.83%
1982	2,094	−0.07%
1990	2,013	−0.49%
1999	2,016	+0.02%
2007	2,159	+0.86%
2012	2,092	−0.63%
2017	2,156	+0.60%
2023	2,234	+0.59%
Source: INSEE

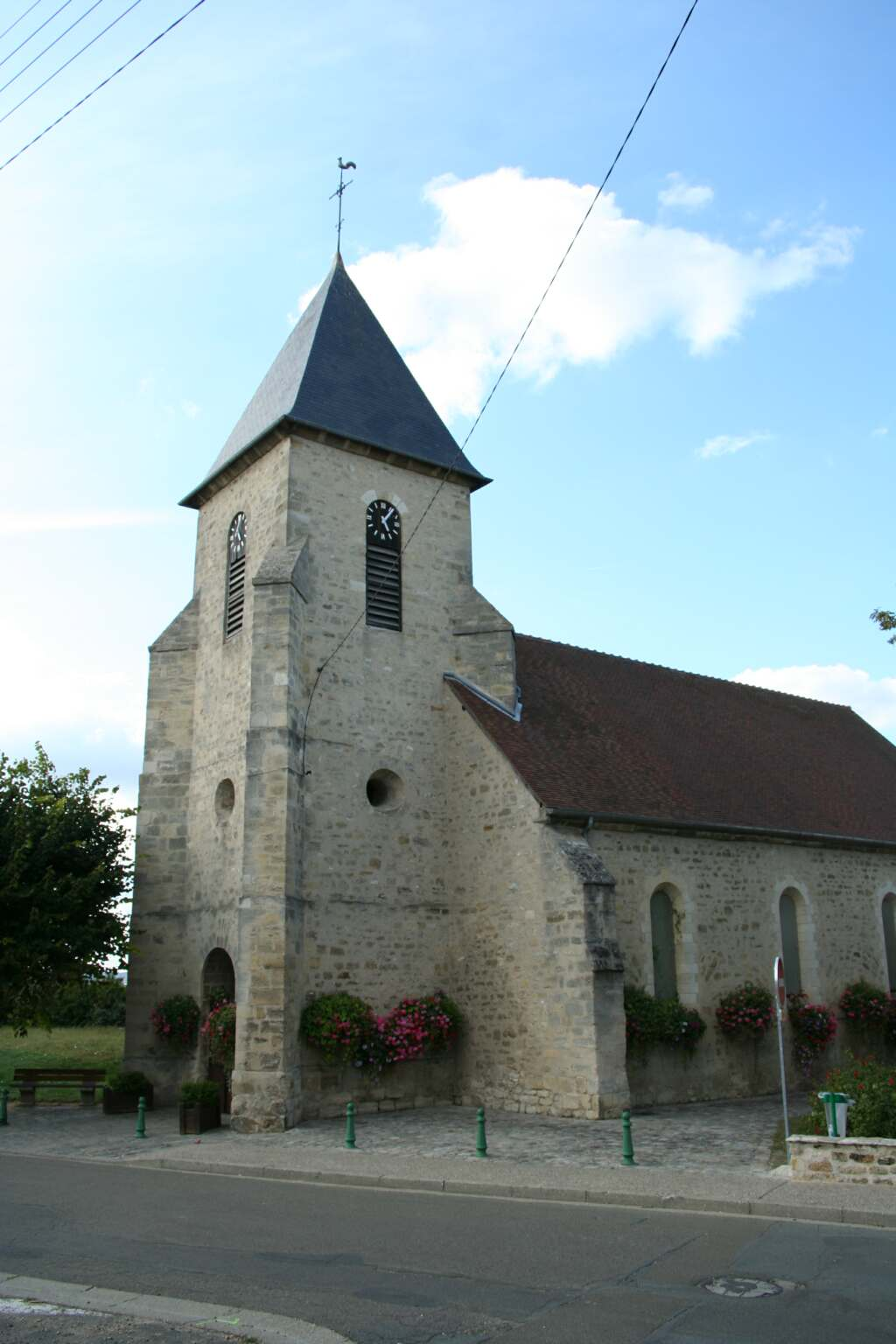
Saint-Martin

== See also ==
- Communes of the Yvelines department
