= KiHa E200 =

Japanese train type

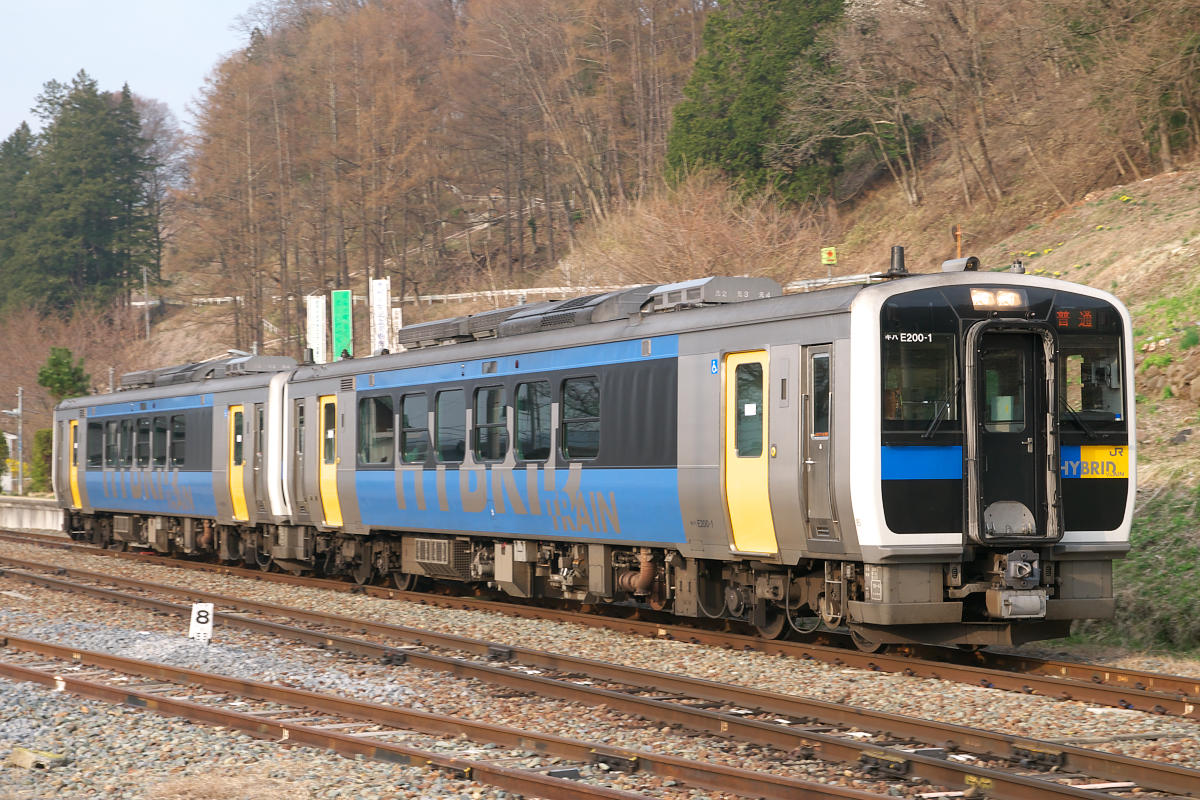
- Two KiHa E200 cars, April 2009
- In service: July 2007–present
- Constructed: 2007
- Number built: 3 vehicles
- Number in service: 3 vehicles
- Formation: Single car (?)
- Capacity: 117 (46 seated)
- Operator: JR East
- Depot: Koumi (Nakagomi)
- Line served: Koumi Line

Specifications
- Car body construction: Stainless steel
- Car length: 20,000 mm (65 ft 7 in)
- Width: 2,920 mm (9 ft 7 in)
- Height: 3,620 mm (11 ft 11 in)
- Floor height: 1,130 mm (3 ft 8 in)
- Doors: 2 sliding doors per side
- Maximum speed: 100 km/h (60 mph)
- Weight: 39.6 t (39.0 long tons; 43.7 short tons)
- Traction system: MT78 (95 kW or 127 hp) x2 (Series hybrid)
- Prime mover: DMF15HZB-G x1
- Power output: 450 hp (340 kW)
- Bogies: DT75 (motored), TR260 (trailer)
- Safety system: ATS-Ps
- Track gauge: 1,067 mm (3 ft 6 in)

The KiHa E200 (キハE200形) is a single-car hybrid diesel multiple unit (DMU) train type operated by East Japan Railway Company (JR East) on the Koumi Line in Japan. Three cars were delivered in April 2007, entering revenue service on 31 July 2007.

The body design is based on the earlier KiHa E130 series DMUs, but with two single doors per side instead of three pairs of doors.

The "KiHa" designation derives from the classification system used by Japanese National Railways (JNR). "Ki" indicates a diesel-powered vehicle, while "Ha" indicates an ordinary passenger car, as opposed to a green car.

The cars incorporate hybrid diesel/battery technology developed on the earlier NE Train experimental hybrid car, and were intended to operate for a period of two years on the Koumi Line to evaluate the viability for full-scale fleet operation.

Two cars are normally used together on Koumi (こうみ) services on the line.

== Hybrid operation cycle ==
On starting from standstill, energy stored in lithium-ion batteries is used to drive the motors, with the engine cut out. The engine then cuts in for further acceleration and running on gradients. When running down gradients, the motor acts as a generator, recharging the batteries. The engine is also used for braking.

== Interior ==
The passenger saloons are arranged with 1+2 abreast transverse seating and longitudinal bench seating at the car ends. Each car includes a wheelchair-compatible toilet.
