= Hashikami Station =

Railway station in Hashikami, Aomori Prefecture, Japan

Hashikami Station 階上駅
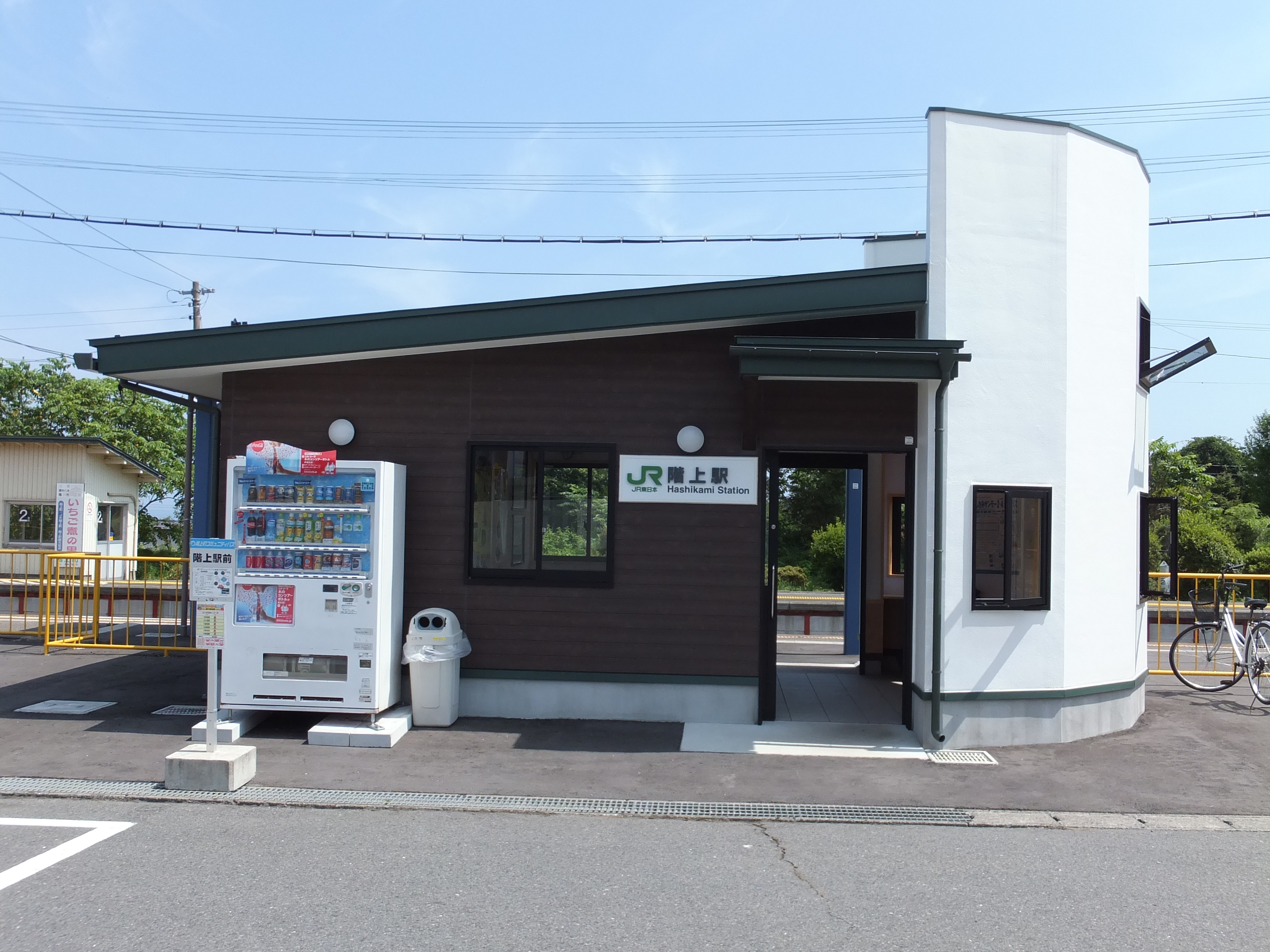
- Hashikami Station in August 2014

General information
- Location: 11 Dobutsu Sakakiyama, Hashikami-machi, Sannohe-gun, Aomori-ken 039-1201; Japan
- Coordinates: 40°27′24.60″N 141°39′53.85″E
- Operator: JR East
- Line: ■ Hachinohe Line
- Distance: 27.5 km from Hachinohe
- Platforms: 2 side platforms
- Tracks: 2

Construction
- Structure type: At grade

Other information
- Status: Unstaffed
- Website: Official website

History
- Opened: 10 November 1924

Services
Preceding station	JR East	Following station
Ōja towards Hachinohe	Hachinohe Line	Kadonohama towards Kuji
Location
- Location within Aomori Prefecture Location within Japan

Hashikami Station (階上駅, Hashikami-eki) is a passenger railway station located in the town of Hashikami, Sannohe District, Aomori Prefecture, Japan. It is operated by the East Japan Railway Company (JR East).

== Lines ==
Hashikami Station is served by the Hachinohe Line, and is 27.5 kilometers from the starting point of the line at Hachinohe Station.

== Station layout ==
Hashikami Station has two opposed side platforms serving two tracks, connected by an footbridge with the station building. The station is unattended.

=== Platforms ===
1	■ Hachinohe Line	for Tanesashi-Kaigan, Same, and Hachinohe
2	■ Hachinohe Line	for Taneichi, Rikuchū-Yagi, and Kuji

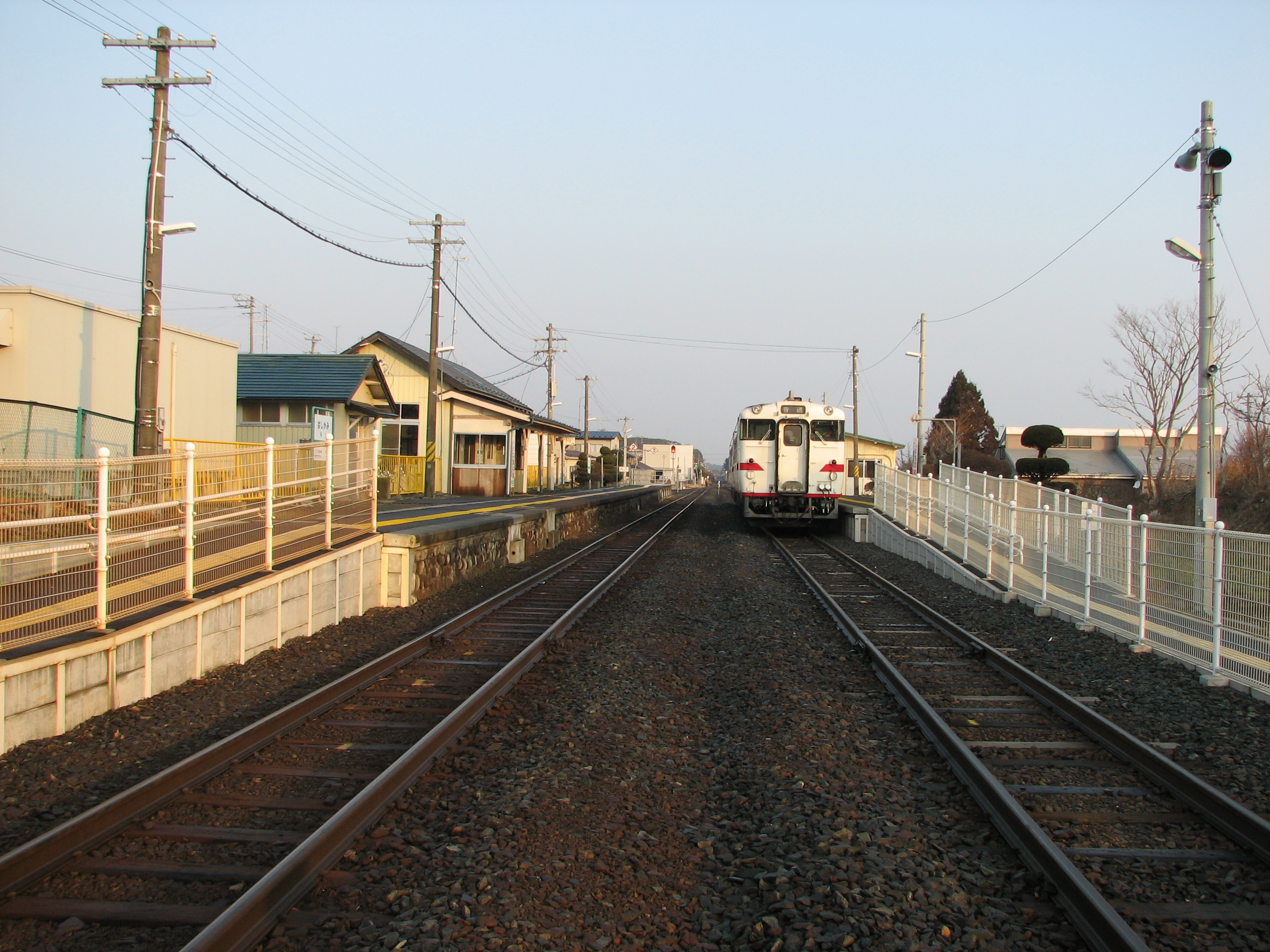
The platforms in March 2008

== History ==
Hashikami Station was opened on November 10, 1924 as a station on the Japanese Government Railways (JGR). With the privatization of Japanese National Railways (JNR, the post-war successor to the JGR) on April 1, 1987, it came under the operational control of JR East.

== Surrounding area ==
- Aomori Prefectural Route 1 Hachinohe Hashikami Line
- Hashikami Station Post Office
- Hashikami Town Community Bus "Hashikami Station" stop

== See also ==
- List of railway stations in Japan
