= Mutsu-Shirahama Station =

Railway station in Hachinohe, Aomori Prefecture, Japan

Mutsu-Shirahama Station 陸奥白浜駅
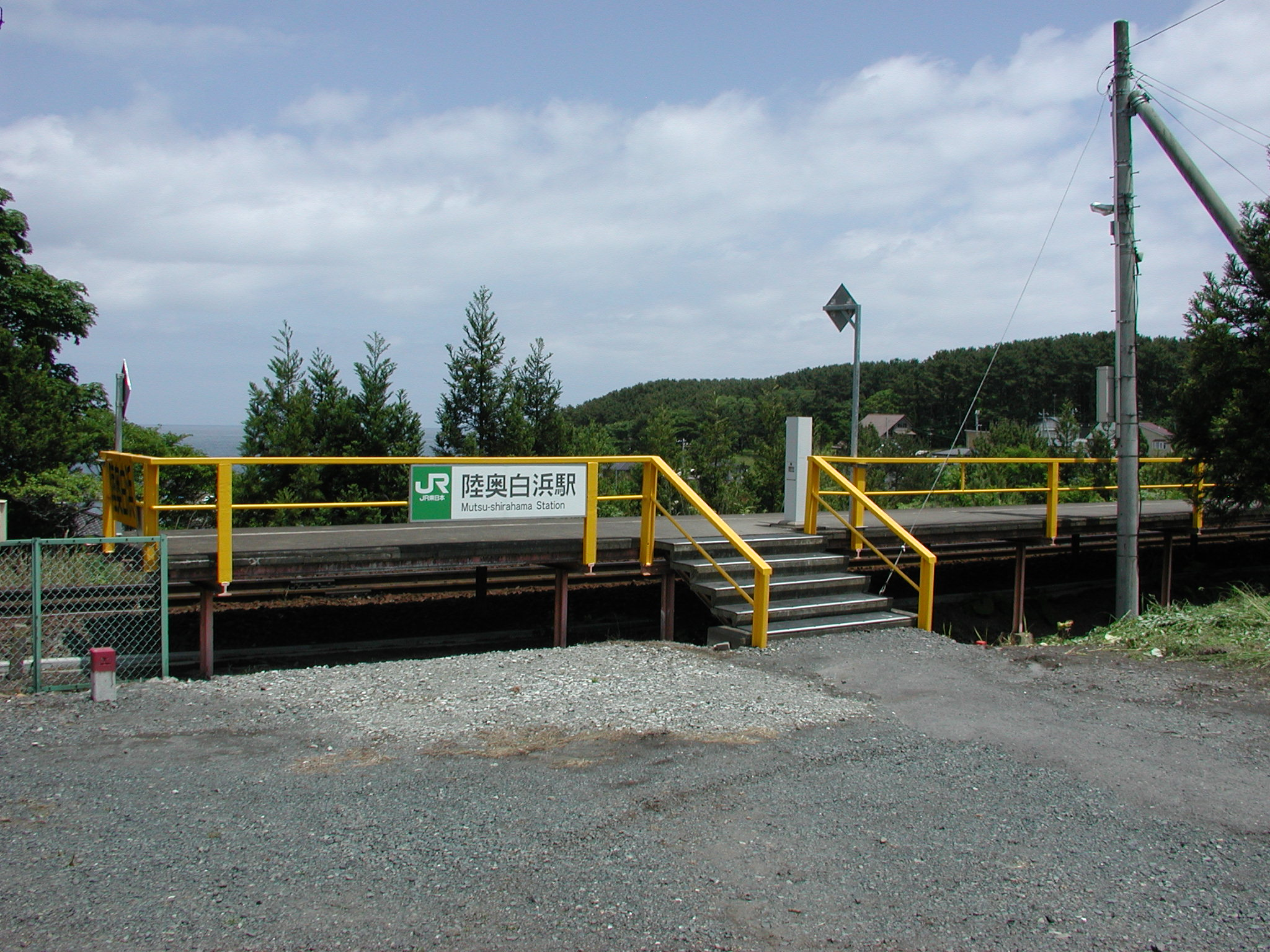
- Mutsu-Shirahama Station

General information
- Location: Samemachi Yokodoro, Hachinohe-shi, Aomori-ken 031-0841; Japan
- Coordinates: 40°31′0.26″N 141°35′30.54″E
- Operator: JR East
- Line: ■ Hachinohe Line
- Distance: 17.5 km from Hachinohe
- Platforms: 1 side platform
- Tracks: 1

Construction
- Structure type: At grade

Other information
- Status: Unstaffed
- Website: JR East station information

History
- Opened: 15 April 1961

Services
Preceding station	JR East	Following station
Same towards Hachinohe	Hachinohe Line	Tanesashi-Kaigan towards Kuji
Location
- Location within Aomori Prefecture Location within Japan

Mutsu-Shirahama Station (陸奥白浜駅, Mutsu-Shirahama-eki) is a passenger railway station within the city limits of Hachinohe, Aomori Prefecture, Japan. It is operated by the East Japan Railway Company (JR East).

== Lines ==
The station is served by the Hachinohe Line and is situated 17.5 kilometers from the northern terminus of the line at Hachinohe Station.

== Station layout ==
Mutsu-Shirahama Station has a single ground-level side platform serving one bi-directional track. There is no station building, but only a small shelter on the platform The station is unattended.

== History ==
The station was opened on April 15, 1961. With the privatization of the Japan National Railways on April 1, 1987, it came under the operational control of JR East.

== Surroundinga area ==
- Sanriku Fukkō National Park

== See also ==
- List of railway stations in Japan
