= Ōja Station =

Railway station in Hashikami, Aomori Prefecture, Japan

Ōja Station 大蛇駅
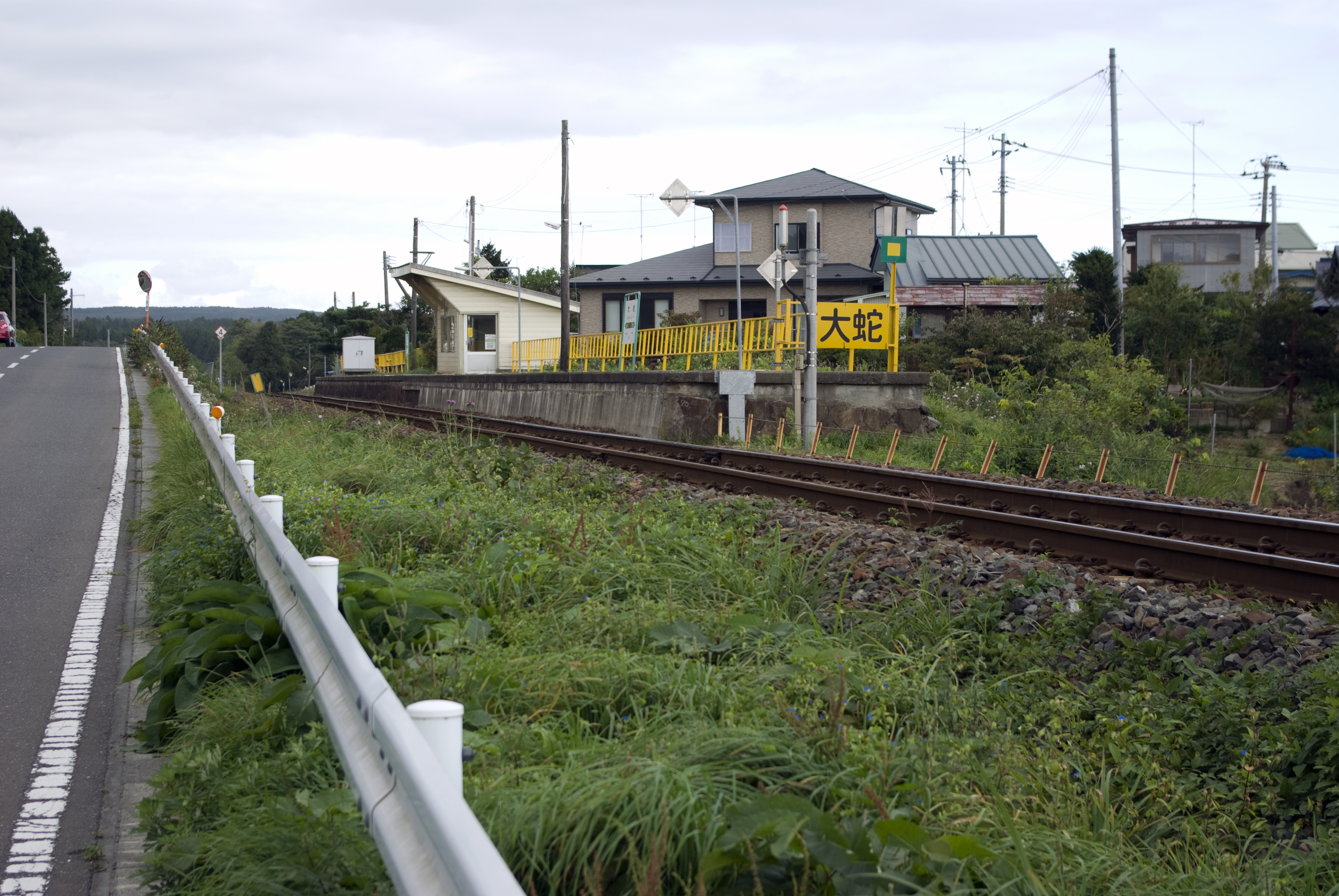
- Ōja Station in September 2009

General information
- Location: Dōbutsu Ōja, Hashikami-machi, Sannohe-gun, Aomori-ken 039-1201; Japan
- Coordinates: 40°28′1.75″N 141°39′2.90″E
- Operator: JR East
- Line: ■ Hachinohe Line
- Distance: 25.8 km from Hachinohe
- Platforms: 1 side platform
- Tracks: 1

Construction
- Structure type: At grade

Other information
- Status: Unstaffed
- Website: Official website

History
- Opened: 10 December 1956

Services
Preceding station	JR East	Following station
Kanehama towards Hachinohe	Hachinohe Line	Hashikami towards Kuji
Location
- Location within Aomori Prefecture Location within Japan

Ōja Station (大蛇駅, Ōja-eki) is a passenger railway station located in the town of Hashikami, Sannohe District, Aomori Prefecture, Japan. It is operated by the East Japan Railway Company (JR East).

== Lines ==
Ōja Station is served by the Hachinohe Line, and is 25.8 kilometers from the terminus of the line at Hachinohe Station.

== Station layout ==
The station has a single ground-level side platform serving one bi-directional track. There is a small rain shelter built on the platform, but there is no station building. The station is unattended.

== History ==
The station opened on December 10, 1956. With the privatization of Japanese National Railways (JNR) on April 1, 1987, it came under the operational control of JR East.

== Surrounding area ==
- Ōja fishing port

== See also ==
- List of railway stations in Japan
