= Tamagawa Station (Iwate) =

Railway station in Hirono, Iwate Prefecture, Japan

Tamagawa Station 玉川駅
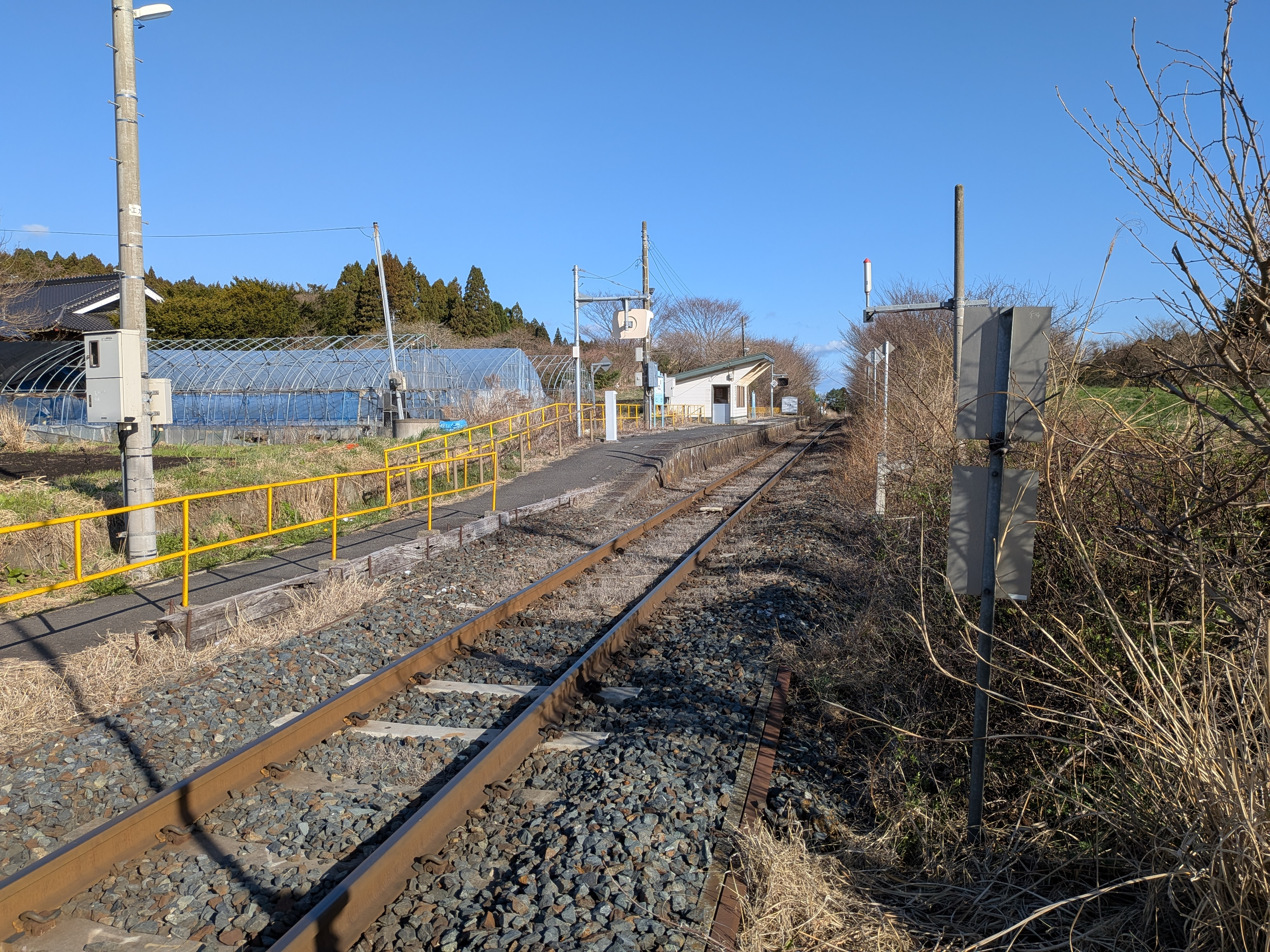
- Tamagawa Station in April 2026

General information
- Location: 7-3, 13th Jiwari, Taneichi, Hirono-machi, Kunohe-gun, Iwate-ken 028-7900; Japan
- Coordinates: 40°22′50″N 141°44′06″E
- Operator: JR East
- Line: ■ Hachinohe Line
- Distance: 38.1 km from Hachinohe
- Platforms: 1 side platform
- Tracks: 1

Construction
- Structure type: At grade

Other information
- Status: Unstaffed
- Website: Official website

History
- Opened: 5 August 1954

Services
| Preceding station | JR East | Following station |
|---|---|---|
| Taneichi towards Hachinohe | Hachinohe Line | Shukunohe towards Kuji |
Location
- Location within Iwate Prefecture Location within Japan

Tamagawa Station (玉川駅, Tamagawa-eki) is a passenger railway station located in the town of Hirono, Kunohe District, Iwate Prefecture, Japan. It is operated by the East Japan Railway Company (JR East).

== Lines ==
Tamagawa Station is served by the Hachinohe Line, and is 38.1 kilometers from the terminus of the line at Hachinohe Station.

== Station layout ==
Tamagawa Station has a single ground-level side platform serving one bi-directional track. There is a small shelter built on top of the platform, but there is no station building. The station is unattended.

== History ==
Tamagawa Station opened on August 5, 1954. Upon the privatization of Japanese National Railways (JNR) on April 1, 1987, the station came under the operational control of JR East.

== Surrounding area ==
- National Route 45

== See also ==
- List of railway stations in Japan
