= Same Station =

Railway station in Hachinohe, Aomori Prefecture, Japan

Same Station 鮫駅
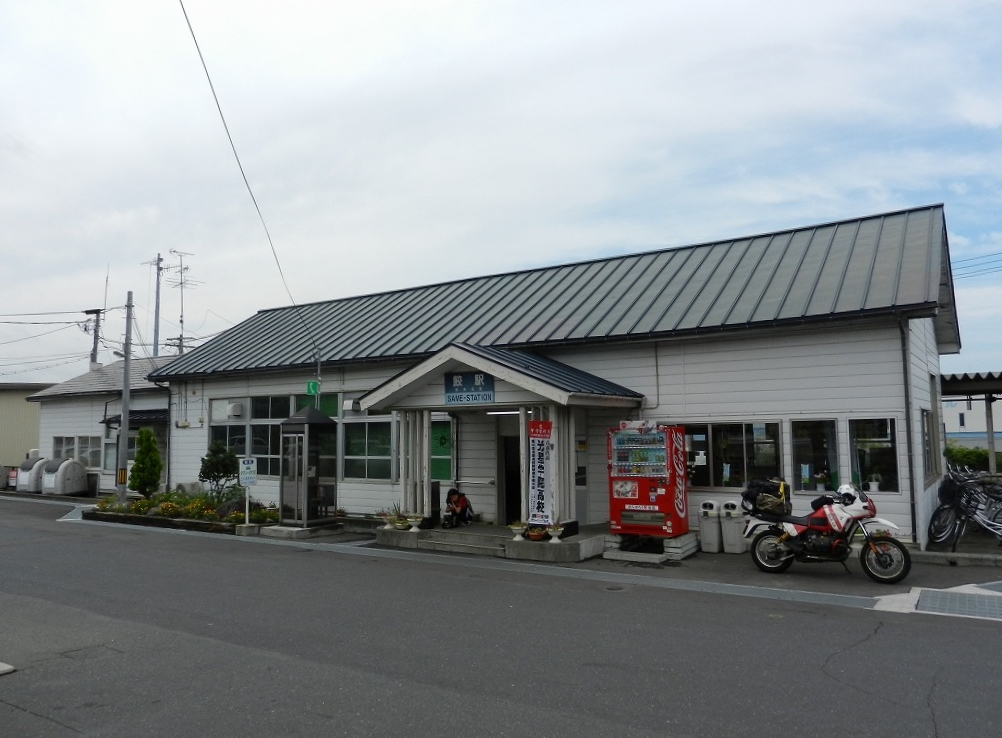
- Same Station in August 2011

General information
- Location: Samemachi, Hachinohe-shi, Aomori-ken031-0841; Japan
- Coordinates: 40°31′49.04″N 141°33′18.57″E
- Operator: JR East
- Line: ■ Hachinohe Line
- Distance: 11.8 km from Hachinohe
- Platforms: 1 side + 1 island platform
- Tracks: 1

Construction
- Structure type: At grade

Other information
- Status: Staffed (Midori no Madoguchi)
- Website: Official website

History
- Opened: 10 November 1924

Passengers
- FY2020: 220

Services
Preceding station	JR East	Following station
Shirogane towards Hachinohe	Hachinohe Line	Mutsu-Shirahama towards Kuji
Location
- Location within Aomori Prefecture Location within Japan

Same Station (鮫駅, Same-eki) is a passenger railway station located in the city of Hachinohe, Aomori Prefecture, Japan. It is operated by East Japan Railway Company (JR East).

== Lines ==
Same Station is served by the Hachinohe Line, and is 11.8 rail kilometers from the starting point of the line at Hachinohe Station.

== Station layout ==
The station has one side platform and one island platform serving three tracks, connected by a footbridge. The station building has a Midori no Madoguchi staffed ticket office in addition to automatic ticket machines.

=== Platforms ===
1, 2	■ Hachinohe Line	for Hon-Hachinohe and Hachinohe
3	■ Hachinohe Line	for Hashikami, Taneichi, and Kuji

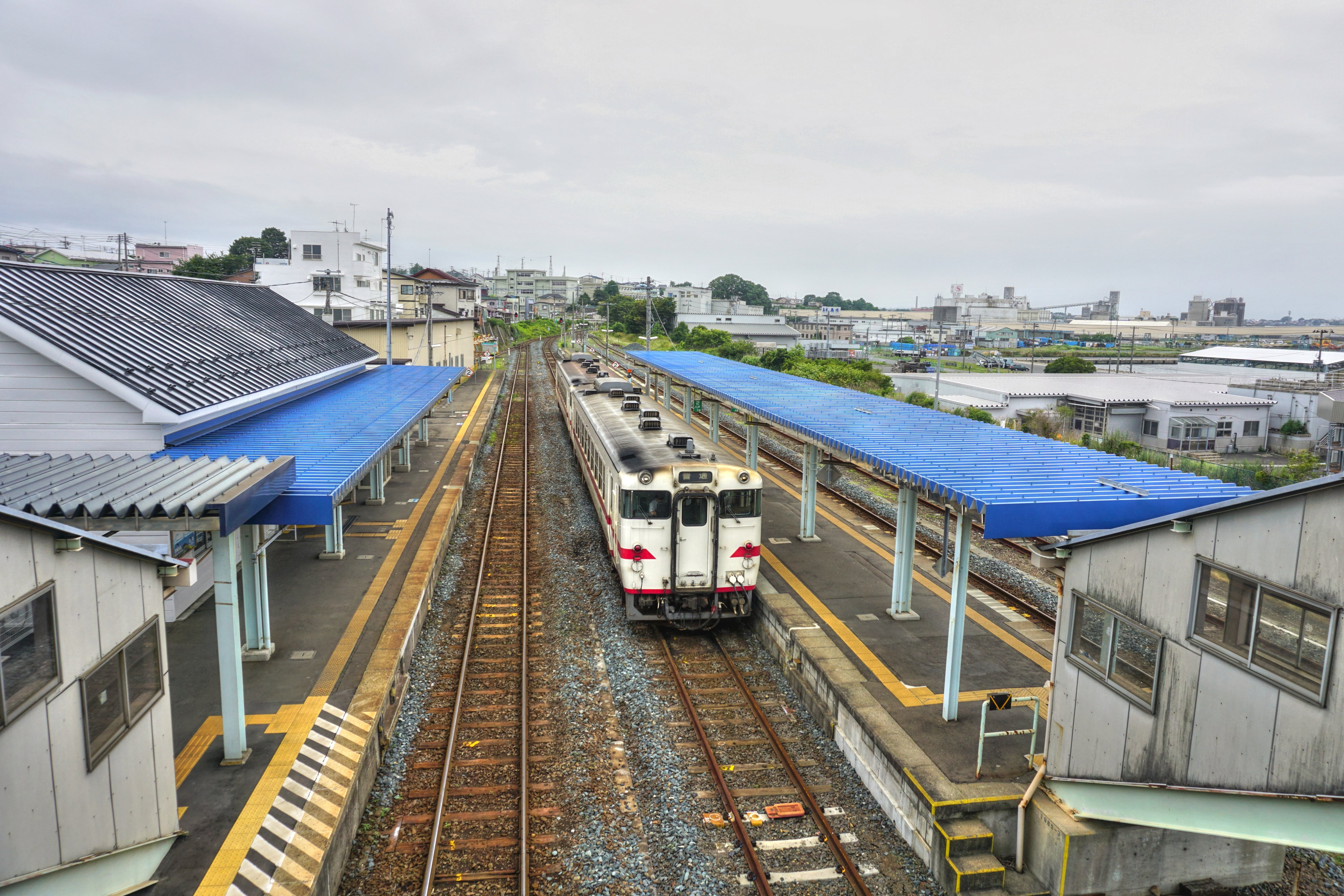
Platforms from the footbridge

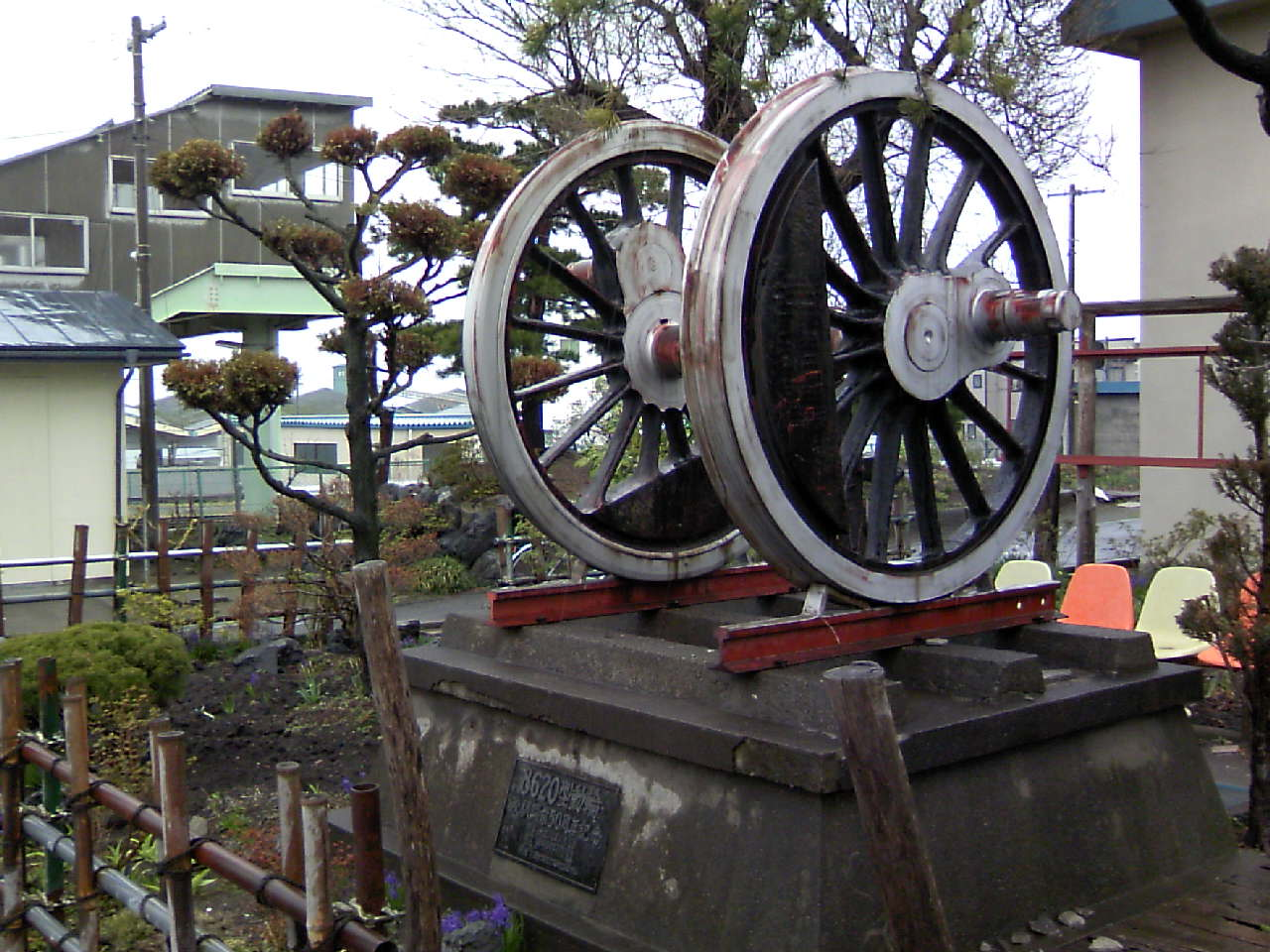
Monument to the station's 50th anniversary (JGR Class 8620 wheels)

== History ==
Same Station opened on November 10, 1924, as a station on the Japanese Government Railways (JGR). With the privatization of the Japanese National Railways (the post-war successor to the JGR) on April 1, 1987, it came under the operational control of JR East.

== Passenger statistics ==
In fiscal 2020, the station was used by an average of 220 passengers daily (boarding passengers only).

== Surrounding area ==
- Hachinohe-Same Post office

== See also ==
- List of railway stations in Japan
