= Samuraihama Station =

Railway station in Kuji, Iwate Prefecture, Japan

Samuraihama Station 侍浜駅
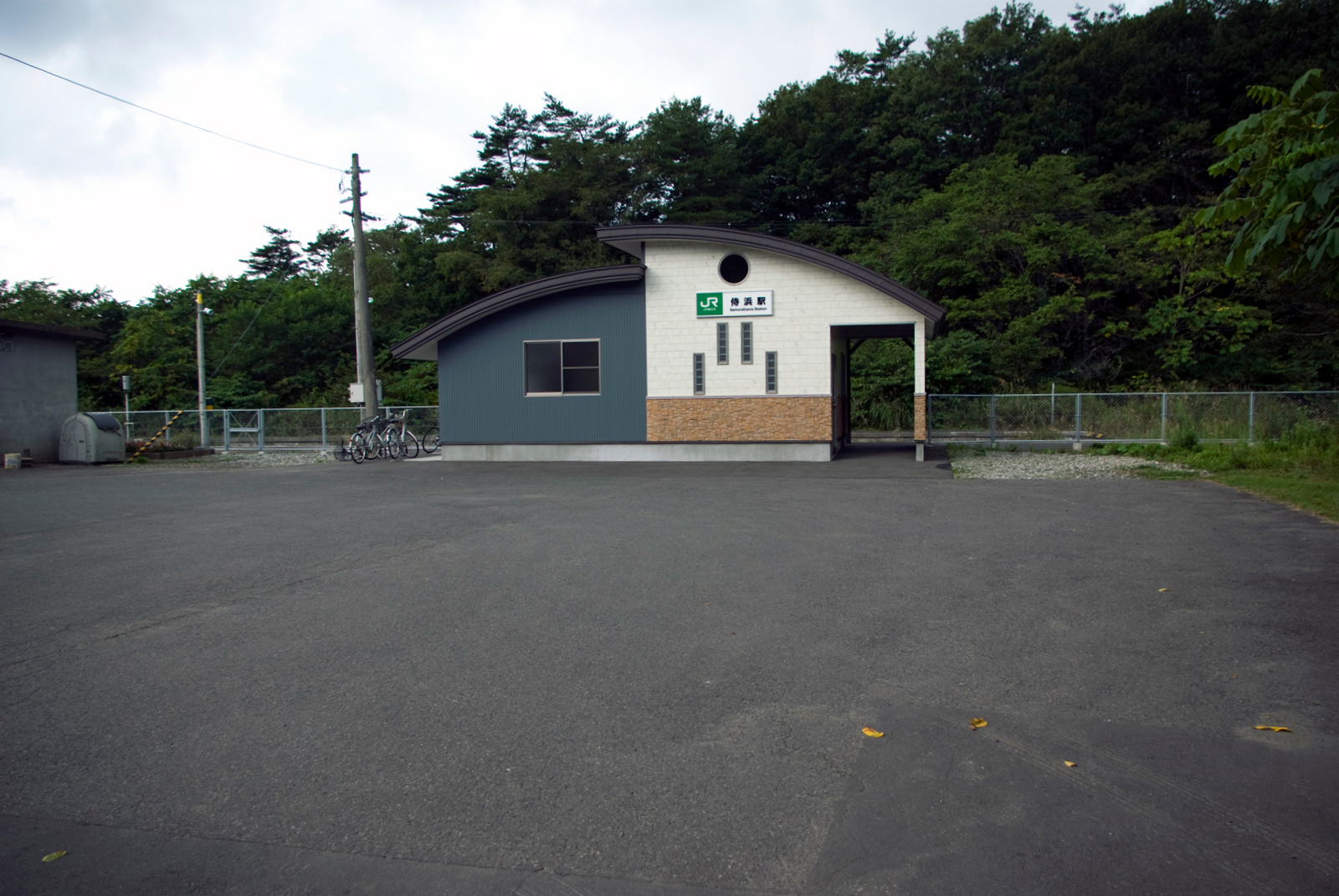
- Samuraihama Station in September 2009

General information
- Location: 1-Horikiri, Samuraihama-chō, Kuji-shi, Iwate-ken 028-7801; Japan
- Coordinates: 40.2612°N 141.7608°E
- Operator: JR East
- Line: ■ Hachinohe Line
- Distance: 54.4 km from Hachinohe
- Platforms: 1 side platform
- Tracks: 1

Construction
- Structure type: At grade

Other information
- Status: Unstaffed
- Website: Official website

History
- Opened: 27 March 1930

Services
Preceding station	JR East	Following station
Rikuchū-Nakano towards Hachinohe	Hachinohe Line	Rikuchū-Natsui towards Kuji
Location
- Location within Iwate Prefecture Location within Japan

Samuraihama Station (侍浜駅, Samuraihama-eki) is a passenger railway station located in the city of Kuji, Iwate Prefecture, Japan. It is operated by the East Japan Railway Company (JR East).

== Lines ==
Samuraihama Station is served by the Hachinohe Line, and is 38.1 kilometers from the terminus of the line at Hachinohe Station.

== Station layout ==
Samuraihama Station has a single ground-level side platform serving one bi-directional track. The station is unattended.

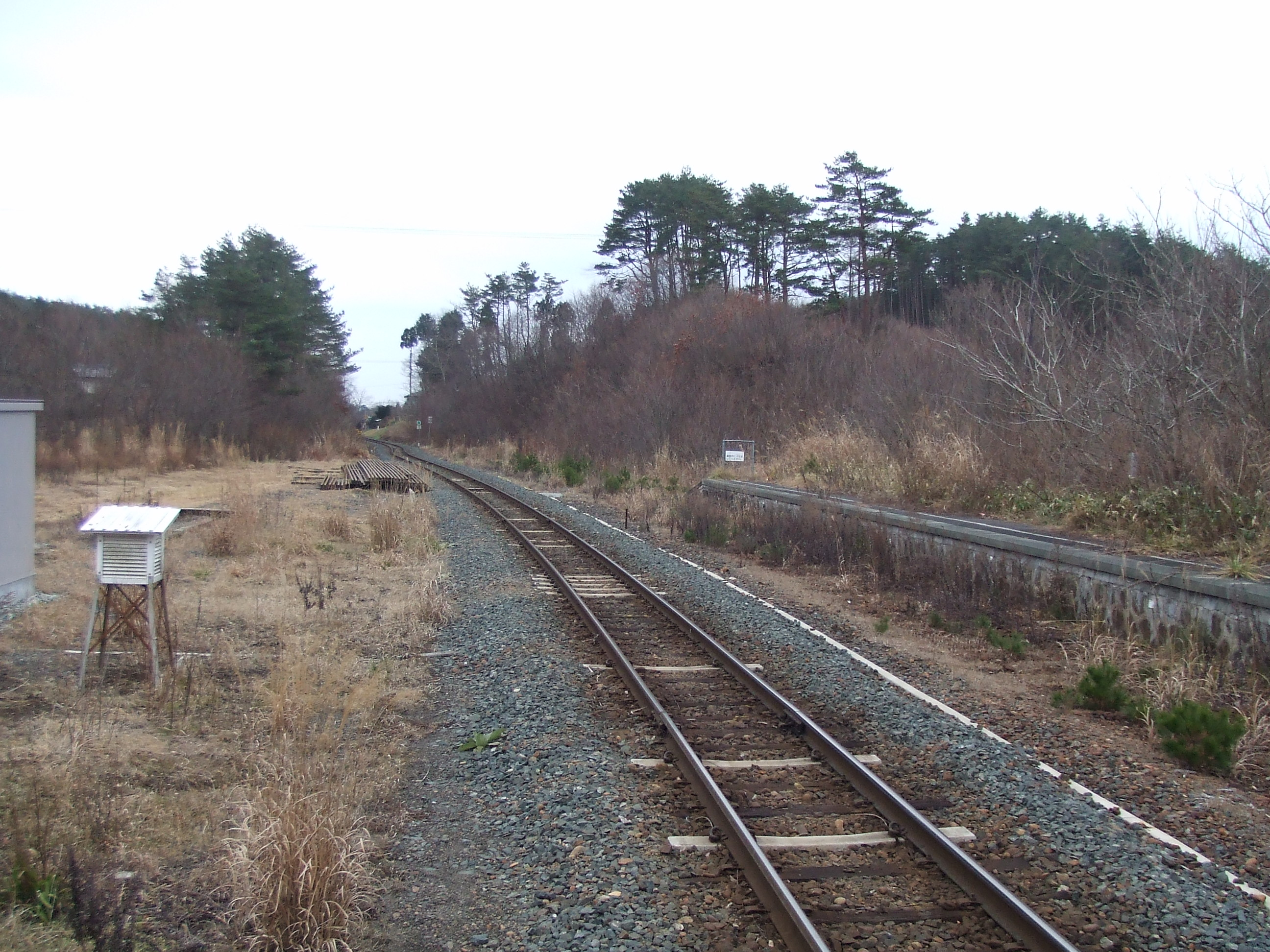
The unused side of the track has been removed (December 2008)

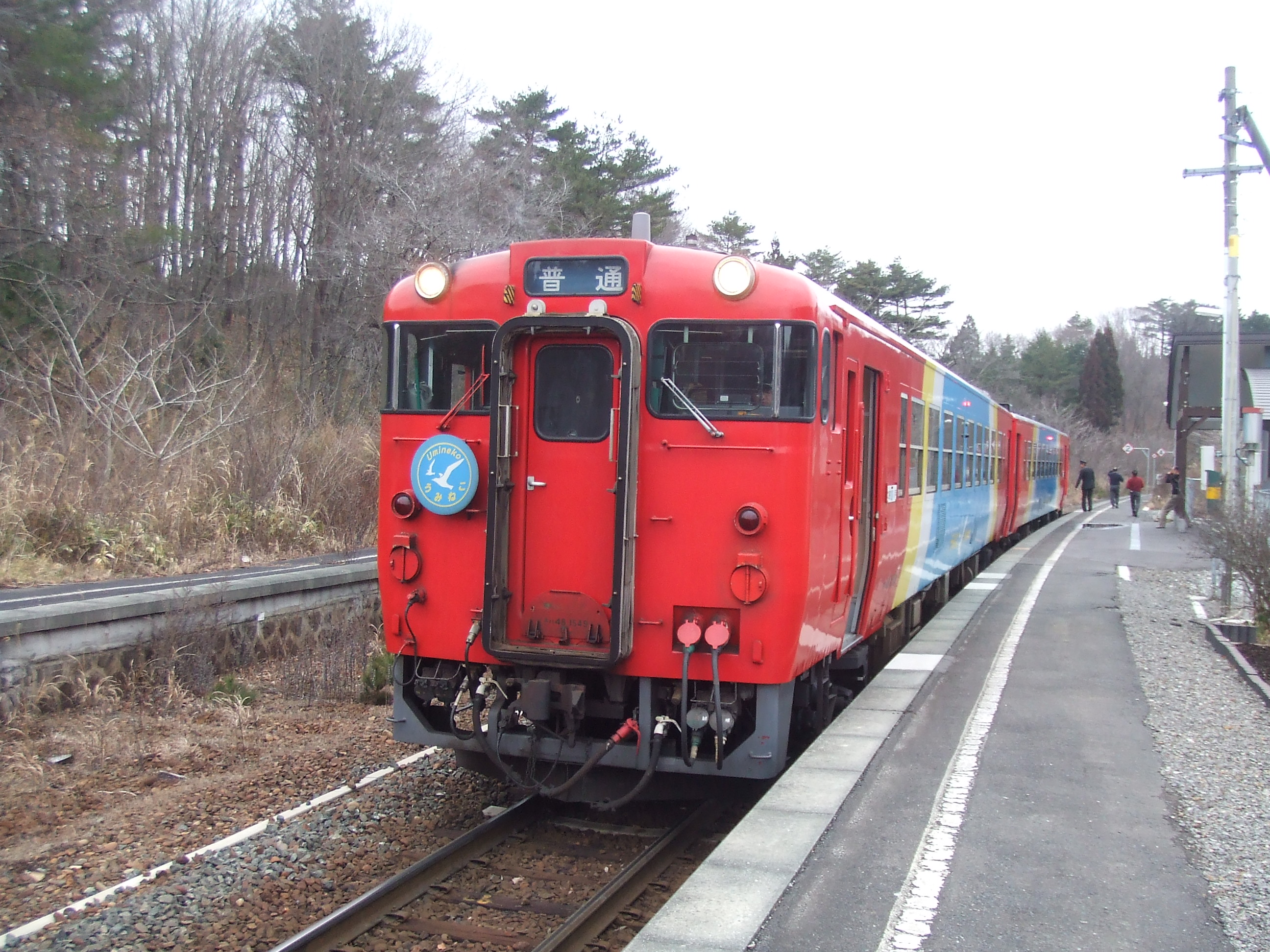
Platform

== History ==
Samuraihama Station opened on March 27, 1930. On April 1, 1987, upon the privatization of Japanese National Railways (JNR), the station came under the operational control of JR East.

== Surrounding area ==
- Samuraihama Post Office
- National Route 45
- National Route 395

== See also ==
- List of railway stations in Japan
