= Shirogane Station =

Railway station in Hachinohe, Aomori Prefecture, Japan

Shirogane Station 白銀駅
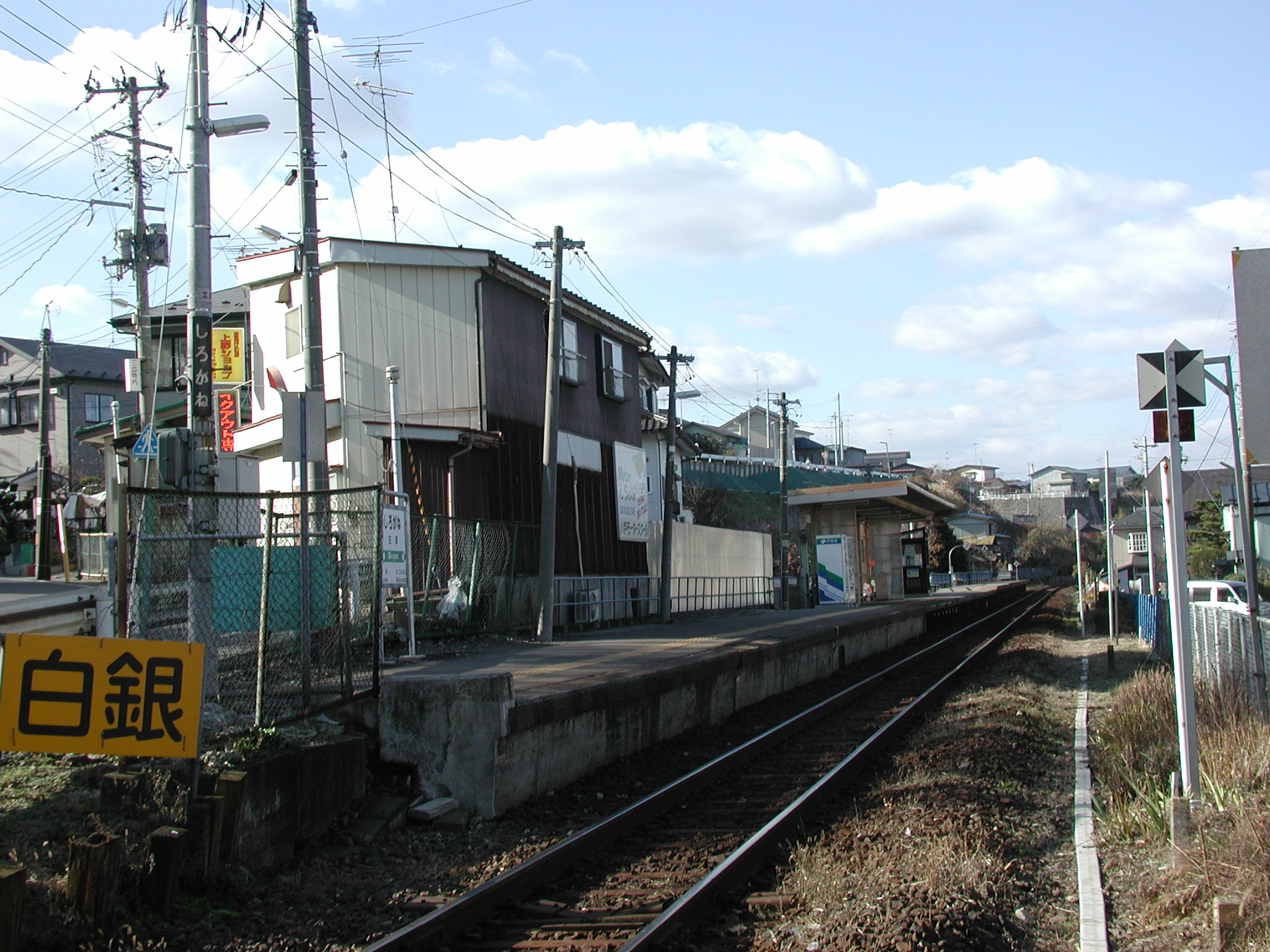
- Shirogane Station

General information
- Location: Shirogane-cho Ozawakatahira, Hachinohe-shi, Aomori-ken 031-0822; Japan
- Coordinates: 40°31′19.38″N 141°32′31.02″E
- Operator: JR East
- Line: ■ Hachinohe Line
- Distance: 10.3 km from Hachinohe
- Platforms: 1 side platform
- Tracks: 1

Construction
- Structure type: At grade

Other information
- Status: Unstaffed
- Website: Official website

History
- Opened: 1 June 1934

Services
Preceding station	JR East	Following station
Mutsuminato towards Hachinohe	Hachinohe Line	Same towards Kuji
Location
- Location within Aomori Prefecture Location within Japan

Shirogane Station (白銀駅, Shirogane-eki) is a passenger railway station located in the city of Hachinohe, Aomori Prefecture, Japan. It is operated by East Japan Railway Company (JR East).

== Lines ==
Shirogane Station is served by the Hachinohe Line, and is 10.3 kilometers from the starting point of the line at Hachinohe Station.

== Station layout ==
The station has a single ground-level side platform serving one bi-directional track. There is a small rain shelter built on top of the platform, but there is no station building. The station is unattended.

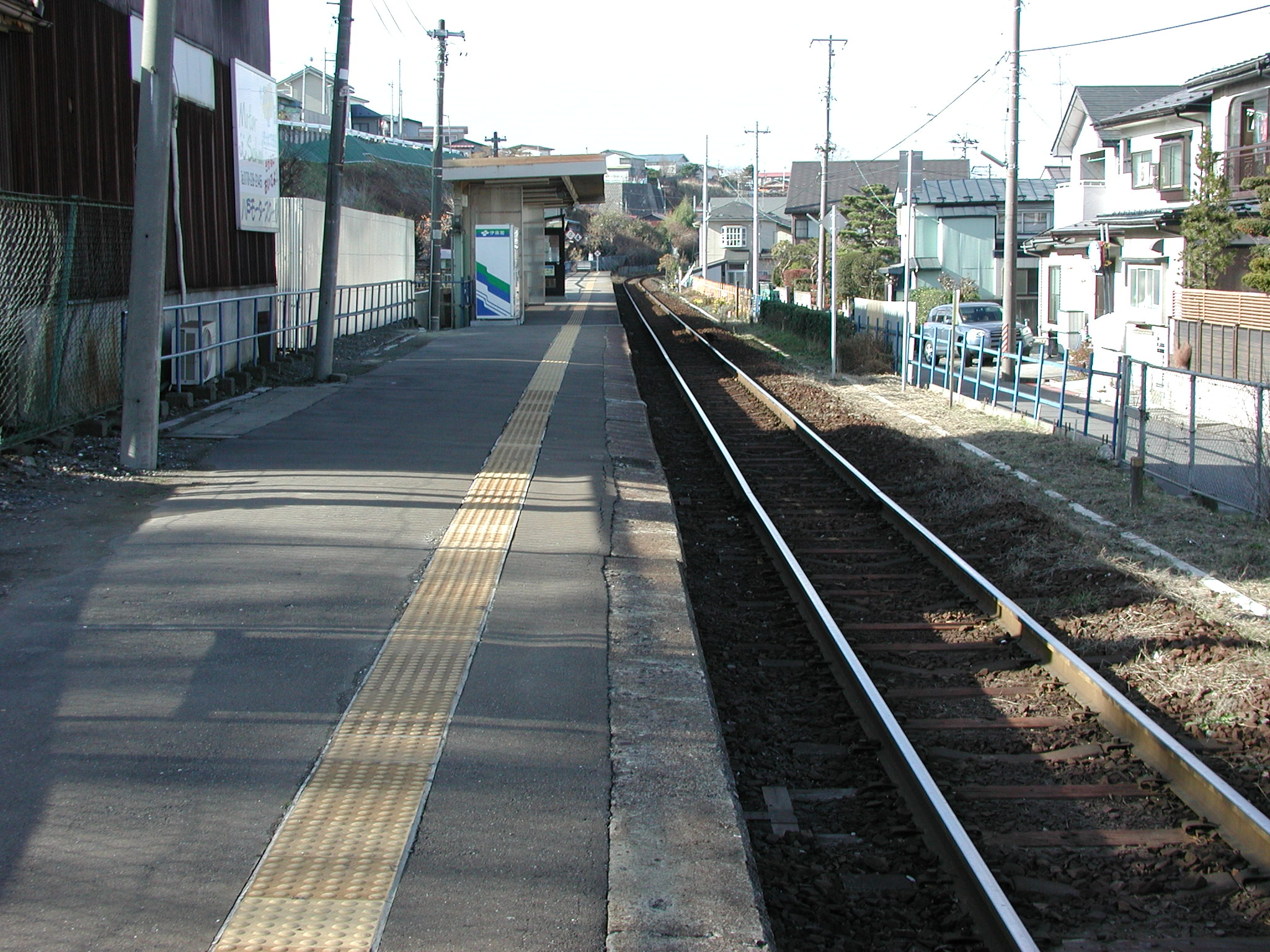
The platform

== History ==
Shirogane Station was opened on June 1, 1934 as a station on the Japanese Government Railways (JGR). With the privatization of Japanese National Railways (JNR, the post-war successor to the JGR) on April 1, 1987, it came under the operational control of JR East.

== Surrounding area ==
- Hachinohe Kita high School
- Hachinohe Fishing Port

== See also ==
- List of railway stations in Japan
