= Rikuchū-Nakano Station =

Railway station in Hirono, Iwate Prefecture, Japan

Rikuchū-Nakano Station 陸中中野駅
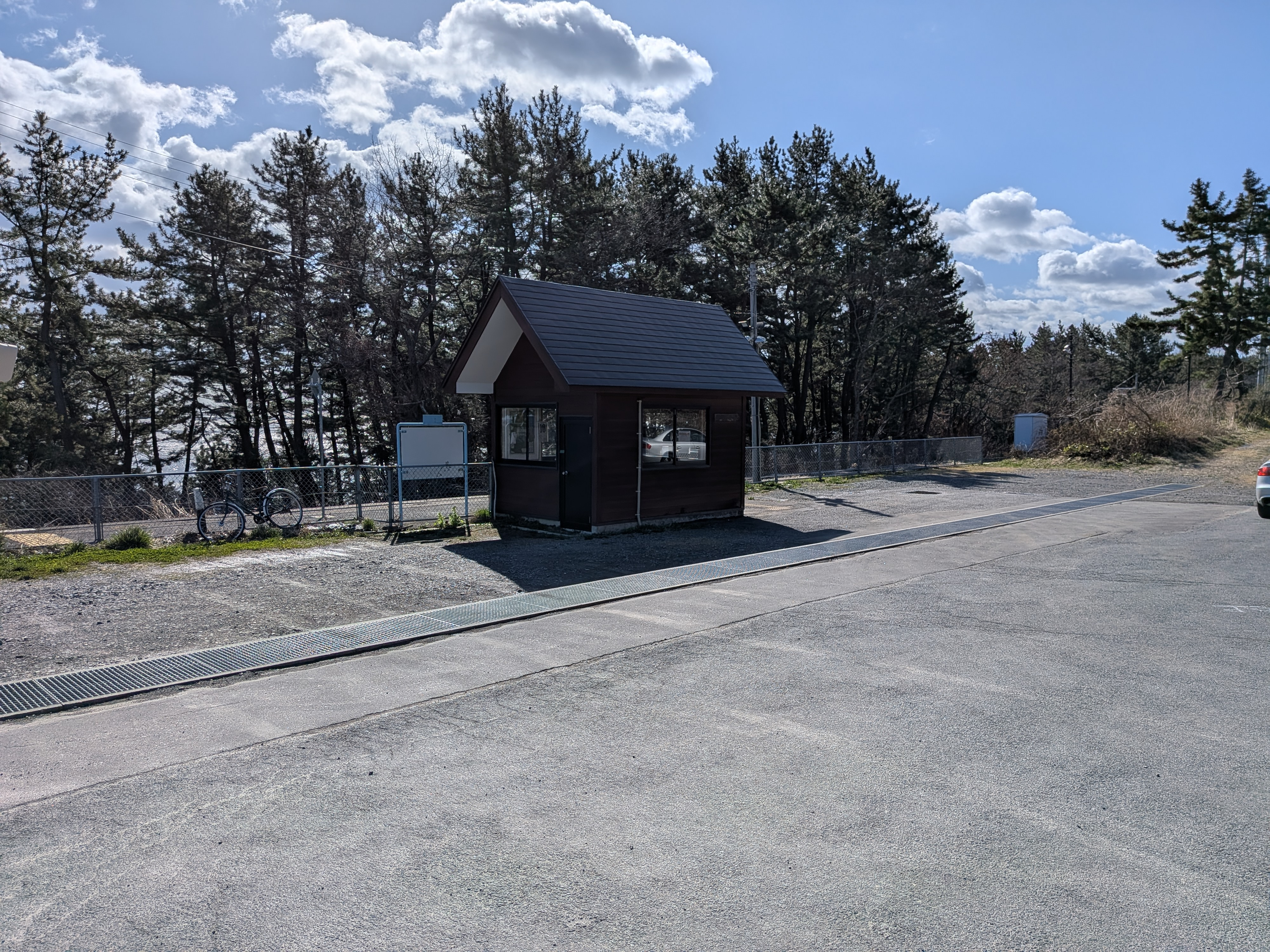
- Rikuchū-Nakano Station in April 2026

General information
- Location: 39-22, 3rd Jiwari, Nakano, Hirono-machi, Kunohe-gun, Iwate-ken 028-7906; Japan
- Coordinates: 40.3049°N 141.7877°E
- Operator: JR East
- Line: ■ Hachinohe Line
- Distance: 48.4 km from Hachinohe
- Platforms: 1 side platform
- Tracks: 1

Construction
- Structure type: At grade

Other information
- Status: Unstaffed
- Website: Official website

History
- Opened: 27 March 1930

Services
Preceding station	JR East	Following station
Uge towards Hachinohe	Hachinohe Line	Samuraihama towards Kuji
Location
- Location within Iwate Prefecture Location within Japan

Rikuchū-Nakano Station (陸中中野駅, Rikuchū-Nakano-eki) is a passenger railway station located in the town of Hirono, Kunohe District, Iwate Prefecture, Japan. It is operated by the East Japan Railway Company (JR East).

== Lines ==
Rikuchū-Nakano Station is served by the Hachinohe Line, and is 48.4 kilometers from the terminus of the line at Hachinohe Station.

== Station layout ==
Rikuchū-Nakano Station has a single ground-level side platform serving one bi-directional track. There is a small rain shelter built on top of the platform, but there is no station building. The station is unattended.

== History ==
Rikuchū-Nakano Station opened on March 27, 1930. On the privatization of Japanese National Railways (JNR) on April 1, 1987, the station came under the operational control of JR East.

== Surrounding area ==
- Rikuchū-Nakano Post Office
- National Route 45

== See also ==
- List of railway stations in Japan
