= Kanehama Station =

Railway station in Hachinohe, Aomori Prefecture, Japan

Kanehama Station 金浜駅
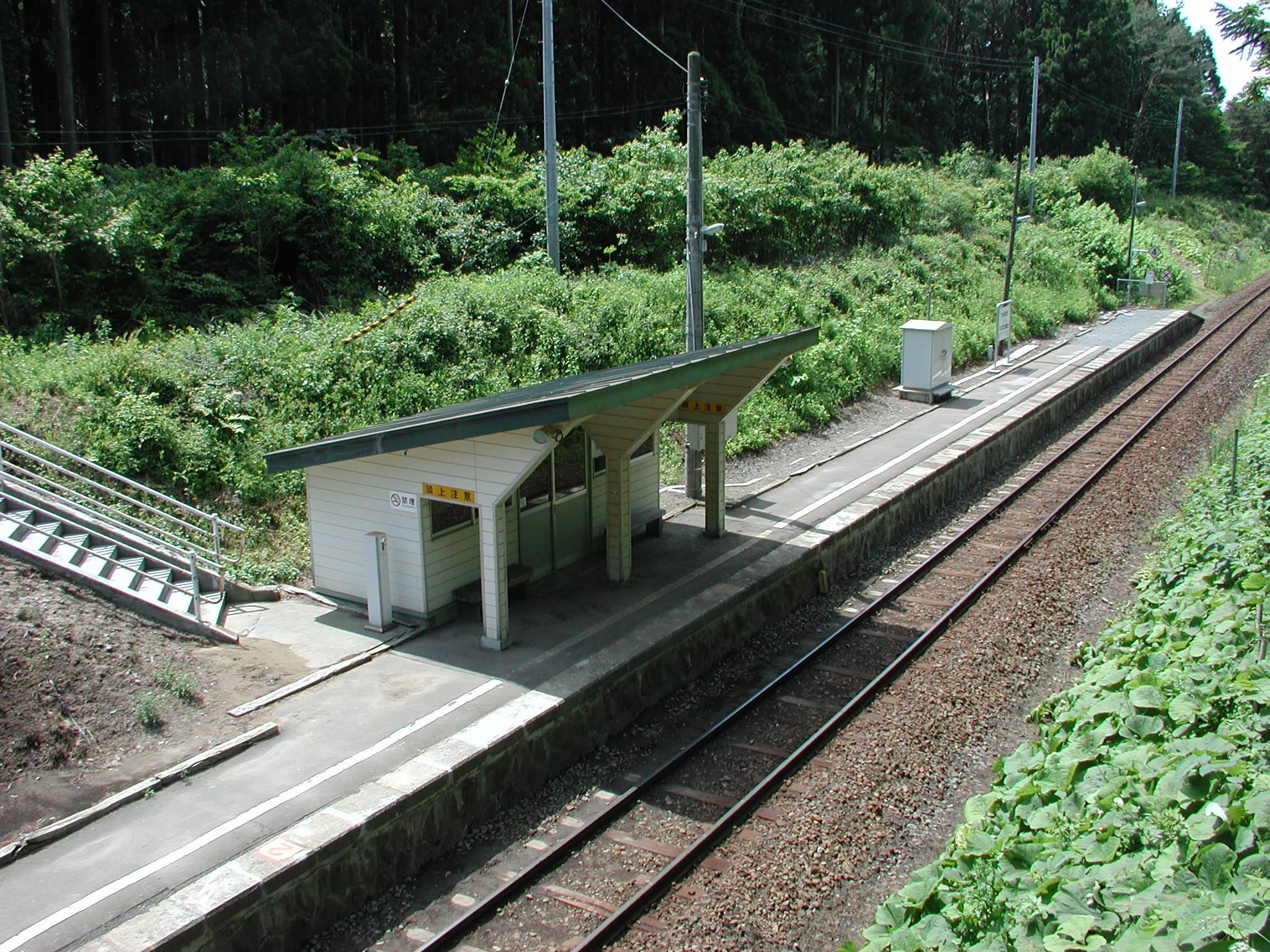
- Kanehama Station in June 2008

General information
- Location: Kanehama, Hachinohe-shi, Aomori-ken 031-0843; Japan
- Coordinates: 40°28′34.32″N 141°38′13.20″E
- Operator: JR East
- Line: ■ Hachinohe Line
- Distance: 24.8 km from Hachinohe
- Platforms: 1 side platform
- Tracks: 1

Construction
- Structure type: At grade

Other information
- Status: Unstaffed
- Website: Official website

History
- Opened: 10 December 1956

Services
| Preceding station | JR East | Following station |
|---|---|---|
| Ōkuki towards Hachinohe | Hachinohe Line | Ōja towards Kuji |
Location
- Location within Aomori Prefecture Location within Japan

Kanehama Station (金浜駅, Kanehama-eki) is a passenger railway station located in the city of Hachinohe, Aomori Prefecture, Japan. It is operated by the East Japan Railway Company (JR East).

== Lines ==
Kanehama Station is served by the Hachinohe Line, and is 24.8 kilometers from the starting point of the line at Hachinohe Station.

== Station layout ==
The station has a single ground-level side platform serving one bi-directional track. There is a small rain shelter built on top of the platform, but there is no station building. The station is unattended.

== History ==
Kanehama Station was opened on December 10, 1956. With the privatization of Japanese National Railways (JNR) on April 1, 1987, it came under the operational control of JR East.

== Surrounding area ==
- National Route 45

== See also ==
- List of railway stations in Japan
