= Kadonohama Station =

Railway station in Hirono, Iwate Prefecture, Japan

Kadonohama Station 角の浜駅
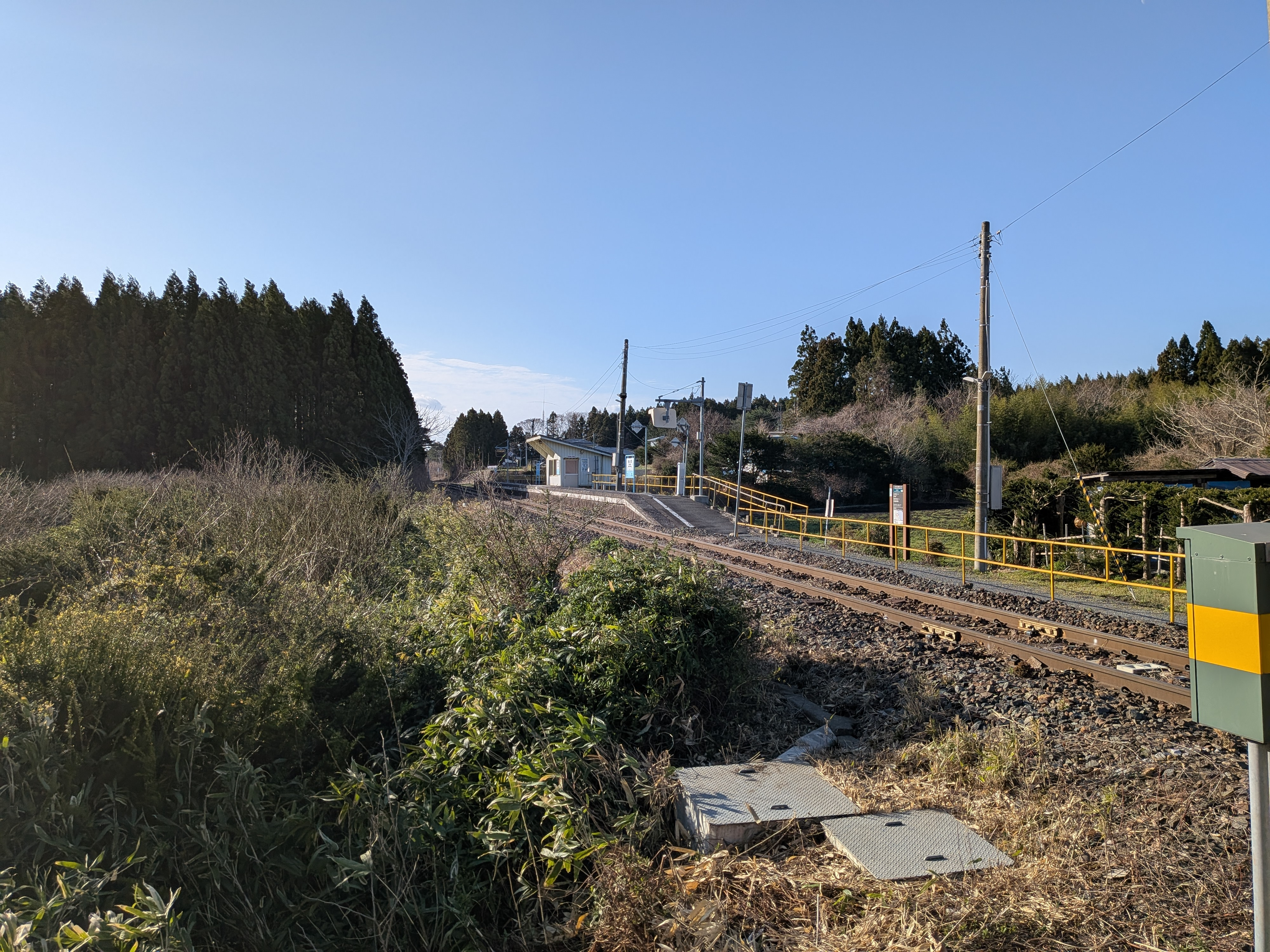
- Kadonohama Station in April 2026

General information
- Location: Dai-39 Jiwari, Taneichi, Hirono-machi, Kunohe-gun, Iwate-ken 028-7900; Japan
- Coordinates: 40.4443°N 141.6820°E
- Operator: JR East
- Line: ■ Hachinohe Line
- Distance: 29.5 km from Hachinohe
- Platforms: 1 side platform
- Tracks: 1

Construction
- Structure type: At grade

Other information
- Status: Unstaffed
- Website: Official website

History
- Opened: 5 August 1954

Services
Preceding station	JR East	Following station
Hashikami towards Hachinohe	Hachinohe Line	Hiranai towards Kuji
Location
- Location within Iwate Prefecture Location within Japan

Kadonohama Station (角の浜駅, Kadonohama-eki) is a passenger railway station located in the town of Hirono, Kunohe District, Iwate Prefecture, Japan. It is operated by the East Japan Railway Company (JR East).

== Lines ==
Kadonohama Station is served by the Hachinohe Line, and is 29.5 kilometers from the terminus of the line at Hachinohe Station.

== Station layout ==
Kadonohama Station has a single ground-level side platform serving one bi-directional track. There is a small rain shelter built on top of the platform, but there is no station building. The station is unattended.

== History ==
Kadonohama Station opened on August 5, 1954. On April 1, 1987, upon the privatization of the Japanese National Railways, the station came under the operational control of JR East.

== Surrounding area ==
- National Route 45

== See also ==
- List of railway stations in Japan
