= Hiranai Station =

Railway station in Hirono, Iwate Prefecture, Japan

Hiranai Station 平内駅
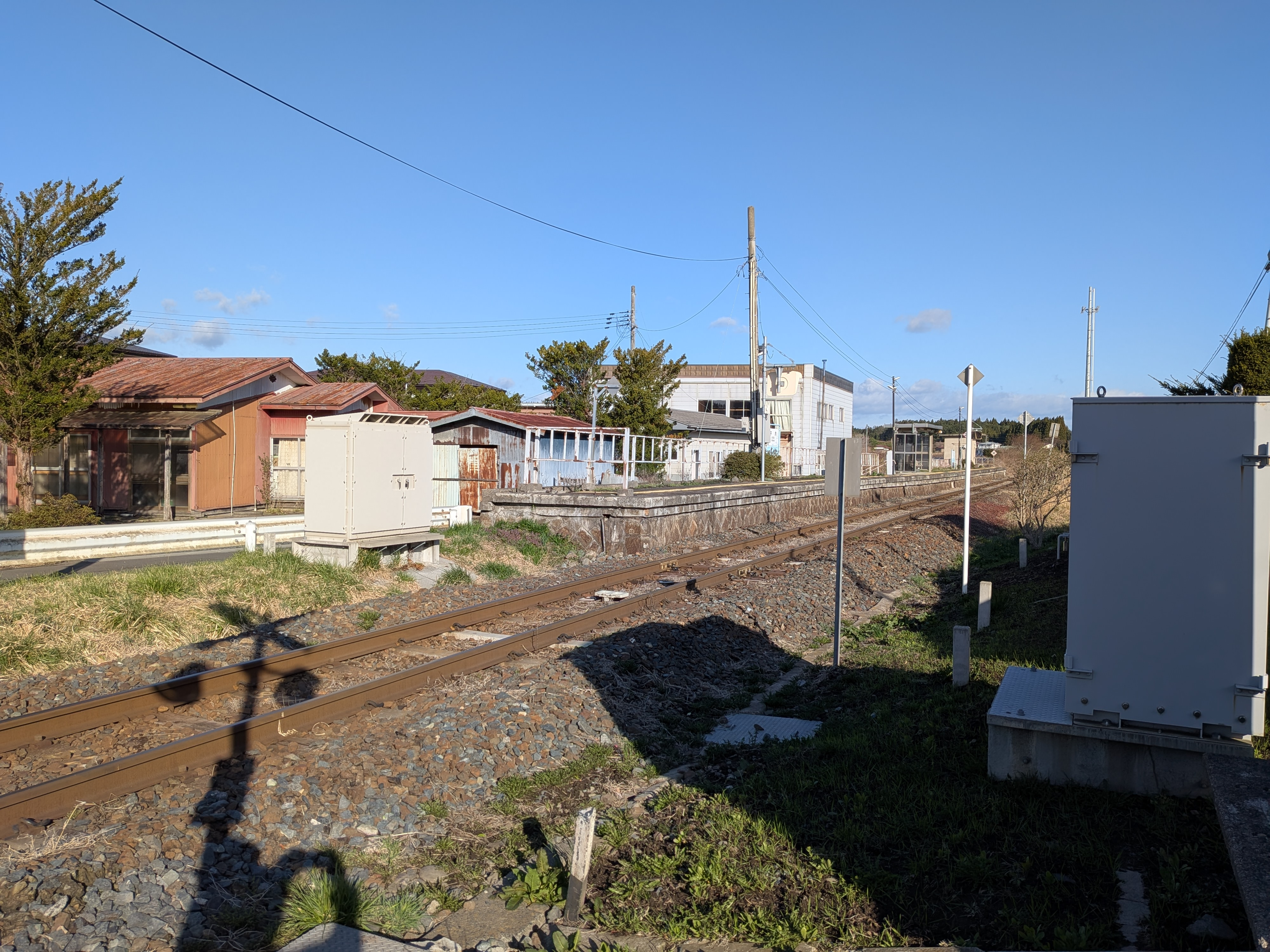
- Hiranai Station in April 2026

General information
- Location: 4-3, 36th Jiwari, Taneichi, Hirono-machi, Kunohe-gun, Iwate-ken 028-7900; Japan
- Coordinates: 40.4256°N 141.6994°E
- Operator: JR East
- Line: ■ Hachinohe Line
- Distance: 32.1 km from Hachinohe
- Platforms: 1 side platform
- Tracks: 1

Construction
- Structure type: At grade

Other information
- Status: Unstaffed
- Website: Official website

History
- Opened: 5 February 1959

Services
Preceding station	JR East	Following station
Kadonohama towards Hachinohe	Hachinohe Line	Taneichi towards Kuji
Location
- Location within Iwate Prefecture Location within Japan

Hiranai Station (平内駅, Hiranai-eki) is a passenger railway station located in the town of Hirono, Kunohe District, Iwate Prefecture, Japan. It is operated by the East Japan Railway Company (JR East).

== Lines ==
Hiranai Station is served by the Hachinohe Line, and is 32.1 kilometers from the terminus of the line at Hachinohe Station.

== Station layout ==
Hirani Station has a single ground-level side platform serving one bi-directional track. There is a small rain shelter built on top of the platform, but there is no station building. The station is unattended.

== History ==
Hiranai Station opened on February 5, 1959. Upon the privatization of the Japanese National Railways (JNR) on April 1, 1987 the station came under the operational control of JR East.

== Surrounding area ==
- Iwate Prefectural Taneichi High School
- National Route 45

== See also ==
- List of railway stations in Japan
