= Uge Station =

Railway station in Hirono, Iwate Prefecture, Japan

Uge Station 有家駅
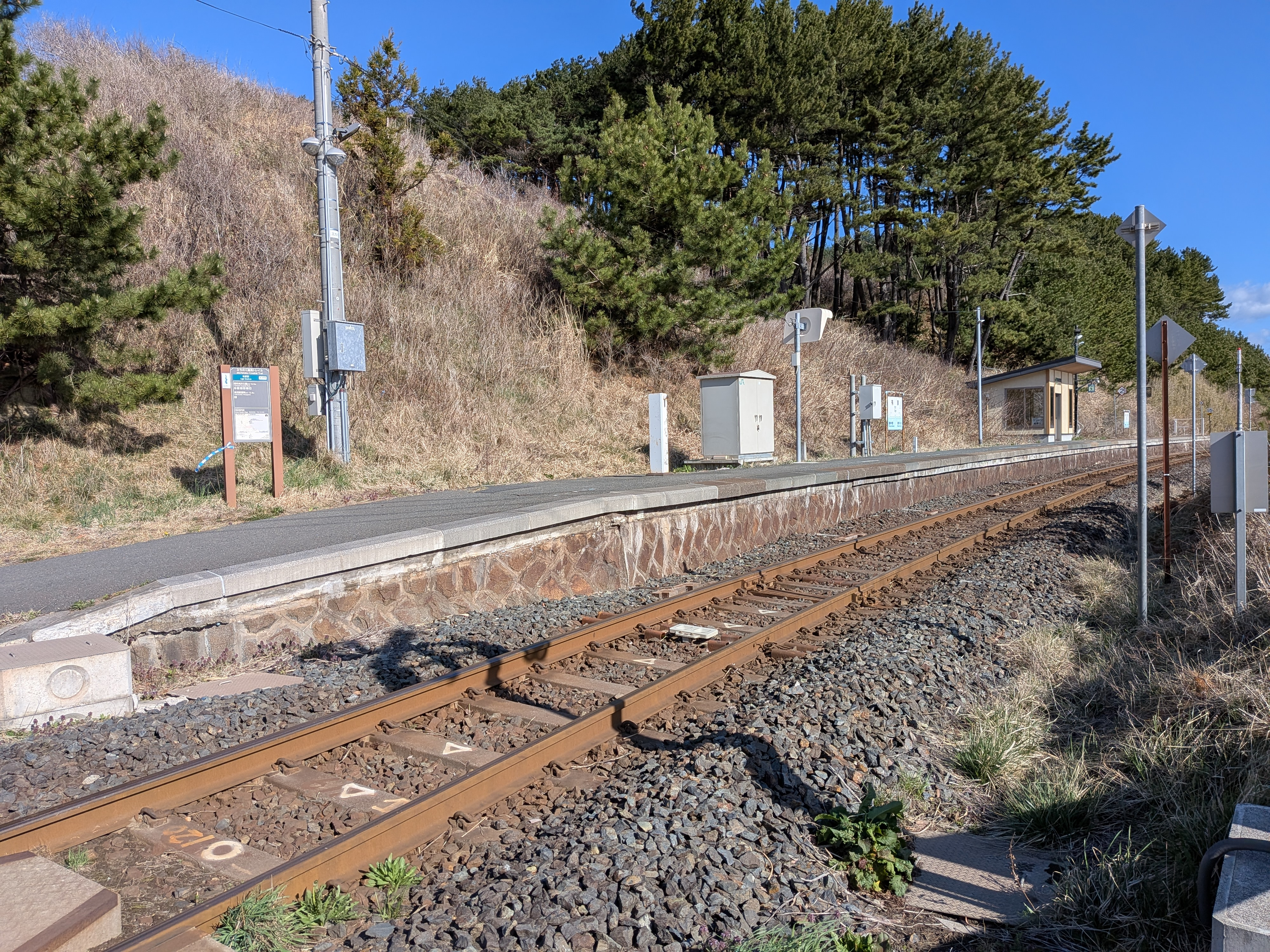
- Uge Station in April 2026

General information
- Location: 46-7, 2nd Jiwari, Uge, Hirono-machi, Kunohe-gun, Iwate-ken 028-7905; Japan
- Coordinates: 40.3238°N 141.7728°E
- Operator: JR East
- Line: ■ Hachinohe Line
- Distance: 45.8 km from Hachinohe
- Platforms: 1 side platform
- Tracks: 1

Construction
- Structure type: At grade

Other information
- Status: Unstaffed
- Website: Official website

History
- Opened: 25 December 1961

Services
| Preceding station | JR East | Following station |
|---|---|---|
| Rikuchū-Yagi towards Hachinohe | Hachinohe Line | Rikuchū-Nakano towards Kuji |
Location
- Location within Iwate Prefecture Location within Japan

Uge Station (有家駅, Uge-eki) is a passenger railway station located in the town of Hirono, Kunohe District, Iwate Prefecture, Japan. It is operated by the East Japan Railway Company (JR East).

== Lines ==
Uge Station is served by the Hachinohe Line, and is 45.8 kilometers from the terminus of the line at Hachinohe Station.

== Station layout ==
Uge Station has a single ground-level side platform serving a single bidirectional track. There is a small rain shelter built on top of the platform, but there is no station building. The station is unattended.

== History ==
Uge Station opened on December 25, 1961. On April 1, 1987, upon the privatization of Japanese National Railways (JNR), the station came under the operational control of JR East.

== Surrounding area ==
- National Route 45

== See also ==
- List of railway stations in Japan
