= Tanesashi-Kaigan Station =

Railway station in Hachinohe, Aomori Prefecture, Japan

Tanesashi-Kaigan Station 種差海岸駅
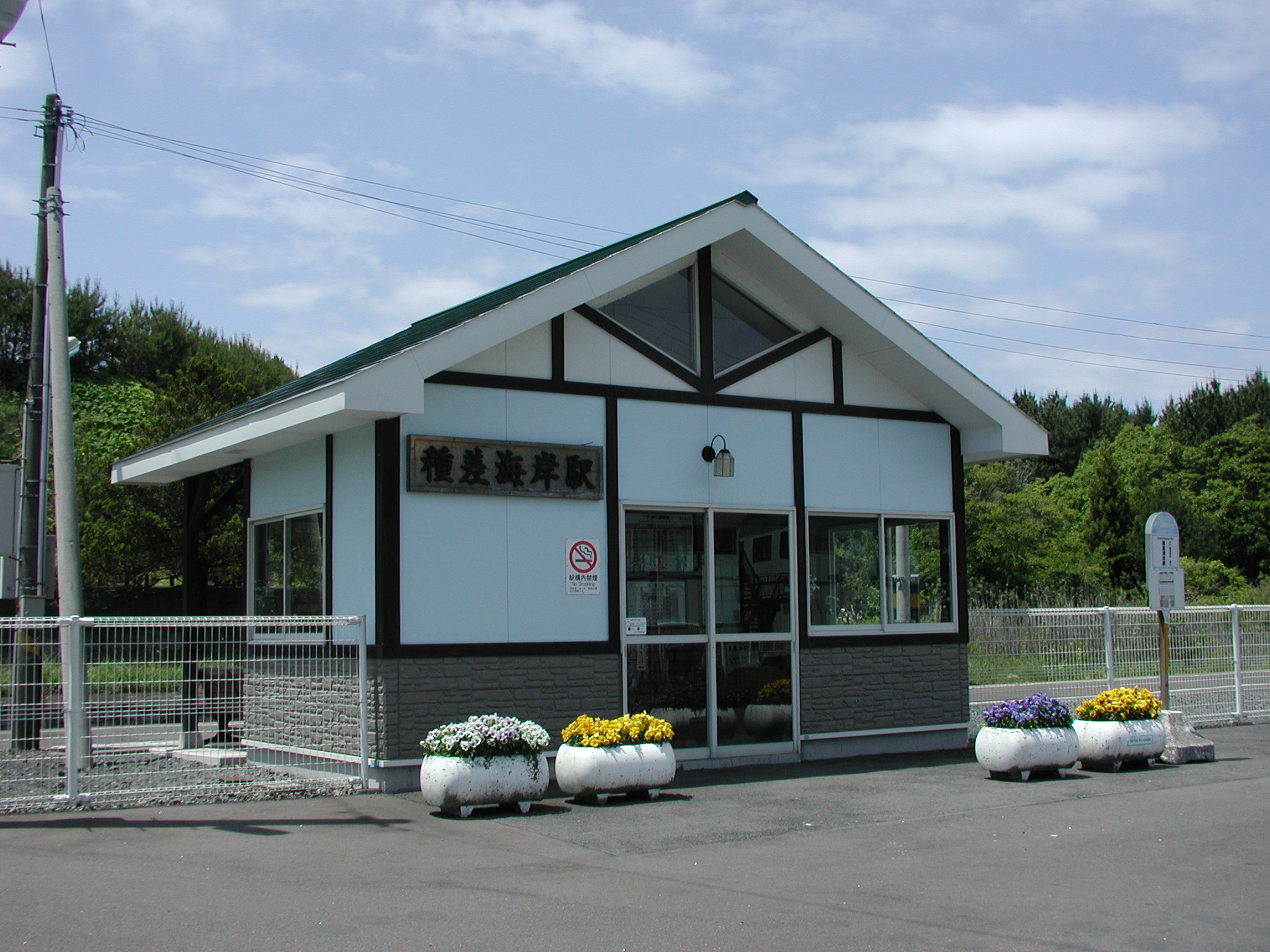
- Tanesashi-Kaigan Station in June 2008

General information
- Location: Samemachi Tanekubo, Hachinohe-shi, Aomori-ken 031-0841; Japan
- Coordinates: 40°30′25.26″N 141°36′26.37″E
- Operator: JR East
- Line: ■ Hachinohe Line
- Distance: 19.6 km from Hachinohe
- Platforms: 1 side platform
- Tracks: 1

Construction
- Structure type: At grade

Other information
- Status: Unstaffed
- Website: Official website

History
- Opened: 10 November 1924
- Former names: Tanesashi (until 1924)

Services
Preceding station	JR East	Following station
Mutsu-Shirahama towards Hachinohe	Hachinohe Line	Ōkuki towards Kuji
Location
- Location within Aomori Prefecture Location within Japan

Tanesashi-Kaigan Station (種差海岸駅, Tanesashi-Kaigan-eki) is a passenger railway station located in the city of Hachinohe, Aomori Prefecture, Japan. It is operated by the East Japan Railway Company (JR East).

== Lines ==
Tanesashi-Kaigan Station is served by the Hachinohe Line, and is 19.6 kilometers from the starting point of the line at Hachinohe Station.

== Station layout ==
The station has a single ground-level side platform serving one bi-directional track. The station is unattended.

== History ==
Tanesashi-Kaigan Station opened on November 10, 1924, as Tanesashi Station (種差駅) on the Japanese Government Railways (JGR), which became the Japanese National Railways (JNR) after World War II. With the privatization of JNR on April 1, 1987, it came under the operational control of JR East. It was renamed Tanesashi-Kaigan Station on December 1, 2002.

== Surrounding area ==
- Tanesashi Coast

== See also ==
- List of railway stations in Japan
