= Naganawashiro Station =

Railway station in Hachinohe, Aomori Prefecture, Japan

Naganawashiro Station 長苗代駅
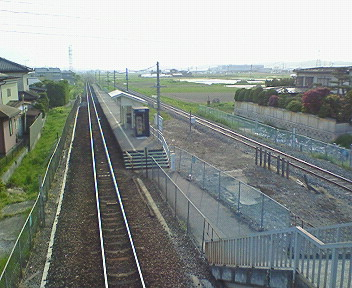
- The station in May 2007 viewed from the Route 104 overpass to the east of the station. The Hachinohe Rinkai Railway lies behind the platform.

General information
- Location: Naganawashiro Shimanomae, Hachinohe-shi, Aomori-ken 039-1103; Japan
- Coordinates: 40°31′17.55″N 141°27′59.11″E
- Operator: JR East
- Line: ■ Hachinohe Line
- Distance: 3.4 km from Hachinohe
- Platforms: 1 side platform
- Tracks: 1

Construction
- Structure type: At grade

Other information
- Status: Unstaffed
- Website: Official website

History
- Opened: 1 June 1934

Services
Preceding station	JR East	Following station
Hachinohe Terminus	Hachinohe Line	Hon-Hachinohe towards Kuji
Location
- Location within Aomori Prefecture Location within Japan

Naganawashiro Station (長苗代駅, Naganawashiro-eki) is a passenger railway station located in the city of Hachinohe, Aomori Prefecture, Japan. It is operated by East Japan Railway Company (JR East).

== Lines ==
Naganawashiro Station is served by the Hachinohe Line, and is 3.4 kilometers from the terminus of the line at Hachinohe Station.

== Station layout ==
The station has a single ground-level side platform serving one bi-directional track. There is a small rain shelter built on the platform, but there is no station building. The station is unattended.

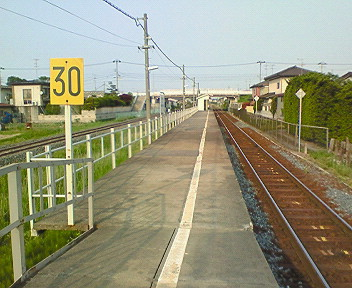
The platform in May 2007

== History ==
Naganawashiro Station opened on June 1, 1934, as a station on the Japanese Government Railways (JGR). With the privatization of Japanese National Railways (JNR, the successor to JGR) on April 1, 1987, it came under the operational control of JR East.

== Surrounding area ==
- Mabechi River
- National Route 45
- National Route 104
- National Route 454

== See also ==
- List of railway stations in Japan
