= Hachinohe Line =

Railway line in Tohoku, Japan

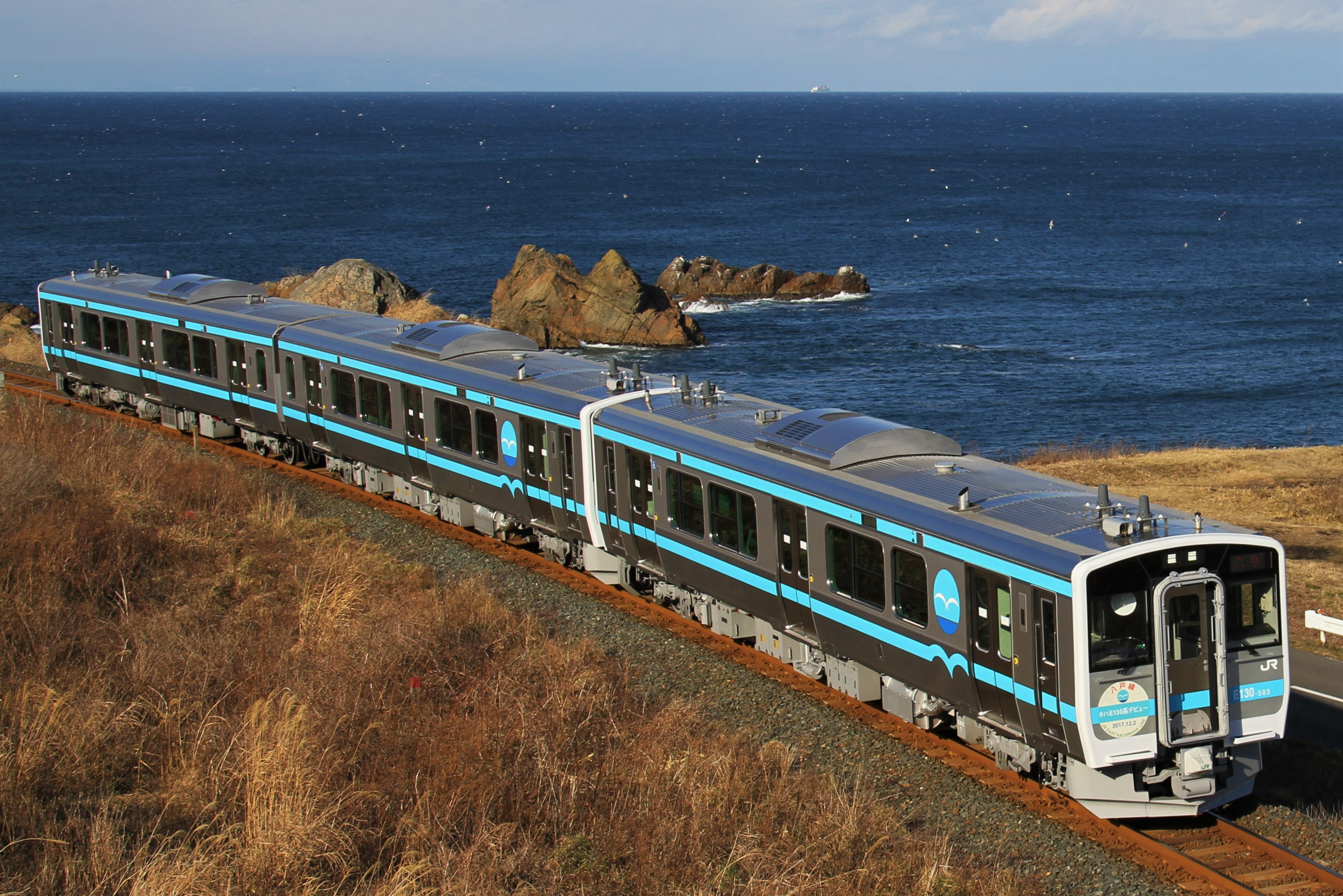
- KiHa E130-500 series DMU running on Hachinohe Line

Overview
- Other name: Umineko Rail Hachinohe-Shinai Line
- Native name: 八戸線
- Status: In operation
- Owner: JR East
- Locale: Aomori and Iwate prefectures
- Termini: Hachinohe; Kuji
- Stations: 25

Service
- Type: Heavy rail
- Rolling stock: KiHa E130 series

History
- Opened: 1894

Technical
- Line length: 64.9 km (40.3 mi)
- Number of tracks: 1
- Track gauge: 1,067 mm (3 ft 6 in)
- Operating speed: 85 km/h (53 mph)
Route map

The Hachinohe Line (八戸線, Hachinohe-sen) is a railway line in the Tohoku Region of Japan, operated by East Japan Railway Company (JR East). It links Hachinohe Station in Hachinohe, Aomori with Kuji Station in Kuji, Iwate. The line stretches 64.9 kilometres (40.3 mi) along the Pacific coast with a total of 25 stations. The section between Hachinohe and Same stations is also known as the Umineko Rail Hachinohe-Shinai Line (うみねこレール八戸市内線).

== Stations ==
Legend
◇, ∨, ∧ - Trains can pass each other at this station
｜ - Trains cannot pass

Station	Distance in km (mi)		Transfers	Tracks	Location	
Station	Between stations	Total	Transfers	Tracks	Location	
Hachinohe 八戸	—N/a	0 (0)	Tohoku Shinkansen; Aoimori Railway Line	∨	Hachinohe	Aomori
Naganawashiro 長苗代	3.4 (2.1)	3.4 (2.1)		｜	Hachinohe	Aomori
Hon-Hachinohe 本八戸	2.1 (1.3)	5.5 (3.4)		◇	Hachinohe	Aomori
Konakano 小中野	1.8 (1.1)	7.3 (4.5)		｜	Hachinohe	Aomori
Mutsu-Minato 陸奥湊	1.7 (1.1)	9.0 (5.6)		◇	Hachinohe	Aomori
Shirogane 白銀	1.3 (0.81)	10.3 (6.4)		｜	Hachinohe	Aomori
Same 鮫	1.5 (0.93)	11.8 (7.3)		◇	Hachinohe	Aomori
Mutsu-Shirahama 陸奥白浜	5.7 (3.5)	17.5 (10.9)		｜	Hachinohe	Aomori
Tanesashi-Kaigan 種差海岸	2.1 (1.3)	19.6 (12.2)		｜	Hachinohe	Aomori
Ōkuki 大久喜	2.2 (1.4)	21.8 (13.5)		｜	Hachinohe	Aomori
Kanehama 金浜	3.0 (1.9)	24.8 (15.4)		｜	Hachinohe	Aomori
Ōja 大蛇	1.0 (0.62)	25.8 (16.0)		｜	Hashikami, Sannohe District	Aomori
Hashikami 階上	1.7 (1.1)	27.5 (17.1)		◇	Hashikami, Sannohe District	Aomori
Kadonohama 角の浜	2.0 (1.2)	29.5 (18.3)		｜	Hirono, Kunohe District	Iwate
Hiranai 平内	2.6 (1.6)	32.1 (19.9)		｜	Hirono, Kunohe District	Iwate
Taneichi 種市	2.1 (1.3)	34.2 (21.3)		｜	Hirono, Kunohe District	Iwate
Tamagawa 玉川	3.9 (2.4)	38.1 (23.7)		｜	Hirono, Kunohe District	Iwate
Shukunohe 宿戸	1.9 (1.2)	40.0 (24.9)		｜	Hirono, Kunohe District	Iwate
Rikuchū-Yagi 陸中八木	3.1 (1.9)	43.1 (26.8)		◇	Hirono, Kunohe District	Iwate
Uge 有家	2.7 (1.7)	45.8 (28.5)		｜	Hirono, Kunohe District	Iwate
Rikuchū-Nakano 陸中中野	2.6 (1.6)	48.4 (30.1)		｜	Hirono, Kunohe District	Iwate
Samuraihama 侍浜	6.0 (3.7)	54.4 (33.8)		｜	Kuji	Iwate
Rikuchū-Natsui 陸中夏井	7.3 (4.5)	61.7 (38.3)		｜	Kuji	Iwate
Kuji 久慈	3.2 (2.0)	64.9 (40.3)	■ Sanriku Railway Rias Line	∧	Kuji	Iwate

== Rolling stock ==
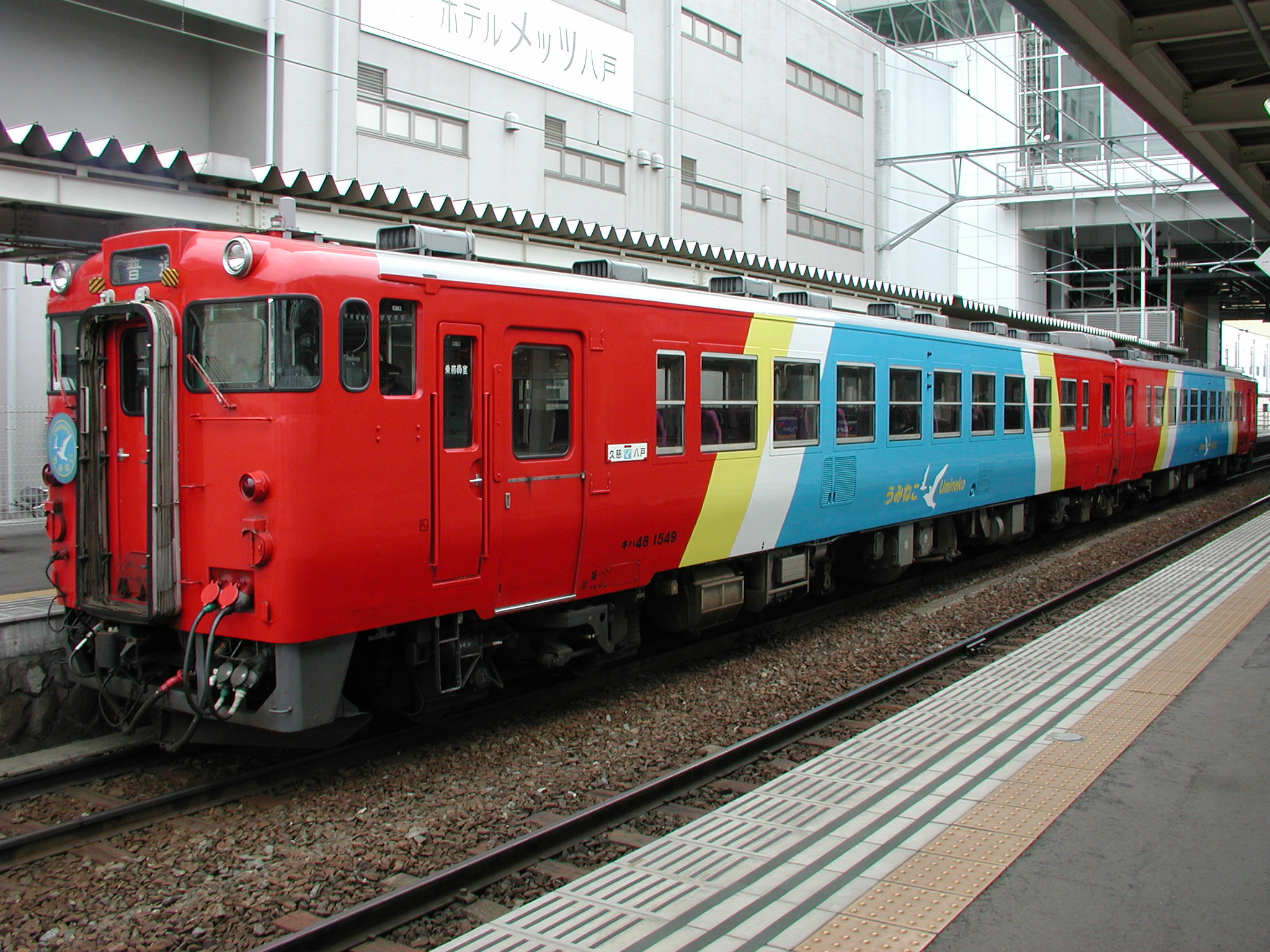
Former KiHa 40 series DMU at Hachinohe Station

New KiHa E130-500 series diesel multiple unit trains were introduced on the Hachinohe Line from 2 December 2017, displacing the aging KiHa 40 series DMUs. All services on the line will be operated by KiHa E130-500 series DMUs from the start of the revised timetable on 17 March 2018.

The fleet consists of six two-car units and six single-car units.

== History ==
In 1894, a spur line connecting Shiriuchi (now Hachinohe) on the Tohoku Main Line with Hachinohe (now Hon-Hachinohe) was completed. This line was soon extended south to the now-defunct Minato Station. After the nationalization of the Nippon Railway in 1907, the spur line was renamed the Hachinohe Line in 1909. From 1924, the line's name was written with its current characters, and the southern terminus of the line was extended to Taneichi in Iwate Prefecture. The following year it reached Rikuchū-Yagi, and in 1930 it reached its present southern terminus of Kuji where it connected to the Sanriku Railway Kita-Rias Line, which links Kuji with Miyako in southern Iwate. Freight operations were phased out at most stations between 1982 and 1986.

With the privatization of the Japanese National Railways (JNR) on April 1, 1987, the Hachinohe Line came under the control of the East Japan Railway Company (JR East), with remaining freight operations transferred to the Japan Freight Railway Company (JR Freight) at Hachinohe Freight Terminal.

=== 2011 Tōhoku earthquake and tsunami ===
The line was damaged by the 2011 Tōhoku earthquake and tsunami on March 11, 2011, and services were suspended on the section between Taneichi and Kuji, with a number of vehicles trapped at Kuji Station. Services over the entire line resumed on March 17, 2012.

=== 2025 Sanriku earthquake ===
The Hachinohe Line sustained significant damage from the 2025 Sanriku earthquake on 8 December 2025. A bridge pier sustained damage from the earthquake, causing service on the entire line to be suspended and replaced by buses. On 22 December, train service resumed between Kuji and Same, while bustitution still continued between Same and Hachinohe. Service on the full line was resumed on 30 December 2025.

== See also ==
- List of railway lines in Japan
