= Taneichi Station =

Railway station in Hirono, Iwate Prefecture, Japan

Taneichi Station 種市駅
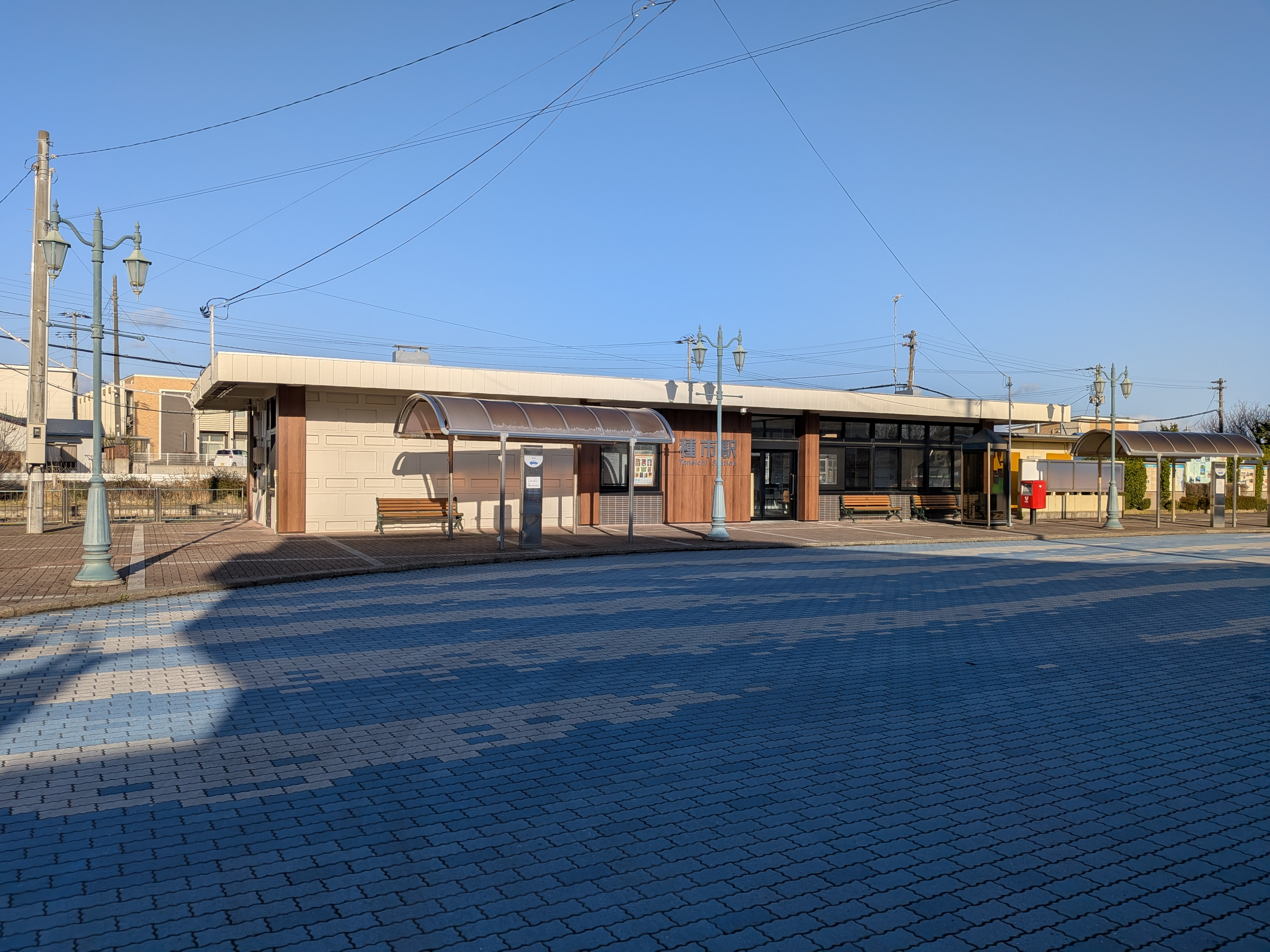
- Taneichi Station in April 2026

General information
- Location: 70, 23rd Jiwari, Taneichi, Taneichi, Hirono-machi, Kunohe-gun, Iwate-ken 028-7900; Japan
- Coordinates: 40°24′37″N 141°42′55″E
- Operator: JR East
- Line: ■ Hachinohe Line
- Distance: 34.2 km from Hachinohe
- Platforms: 1 side platform
- Tracks: 1

Construction
- Structure type: At grade

Other information
- Status: Unattended
- Website: Official website

History
- Opened: 10 October 1924

Passengers
- FY2021: 89

Services
Preceding station	JR East	Following station
Hiranai towards Hachinohe	Hachinohe Line	Tamagawa towards Kuji
Location
- Location within Iwate Prefecture Location within Japan

Taneichi Station (種市駅, Taneichi-eki) is a passenger railway station located in the town of Hirono, Kunohe District, Iwate Prefecture, Japan. It is operated by the East Japan Railway Company (JR East).

== Lines ==
Taneichi Station is served by the Hachinohe Line, and is 34.2 kilometers from the terminus of the line at Hachinohe Station.

== Station layout ==
Taneichi Station has a ground-level side platform serving one bi-directional track. The station is unattended.

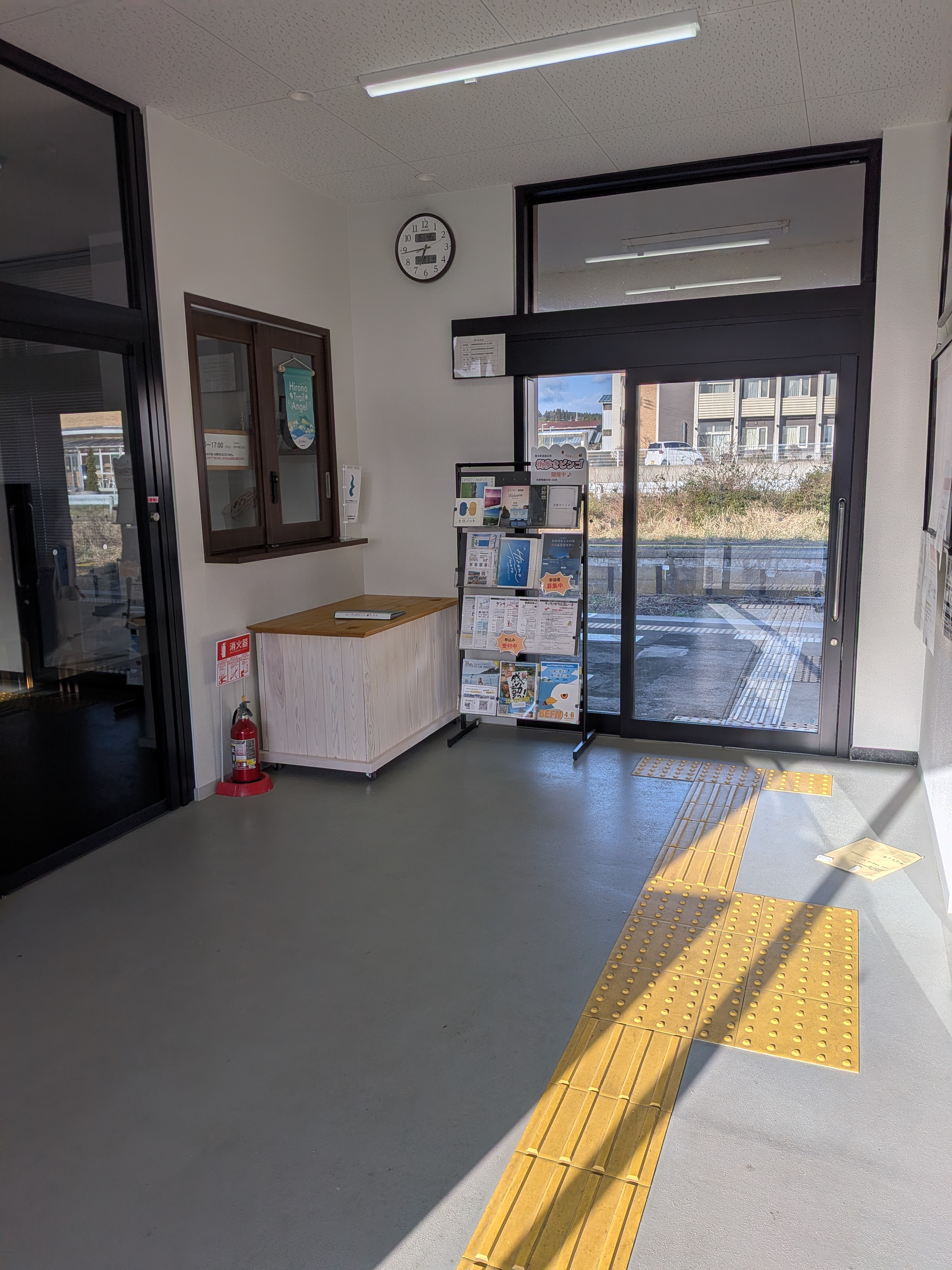
Wicket gate

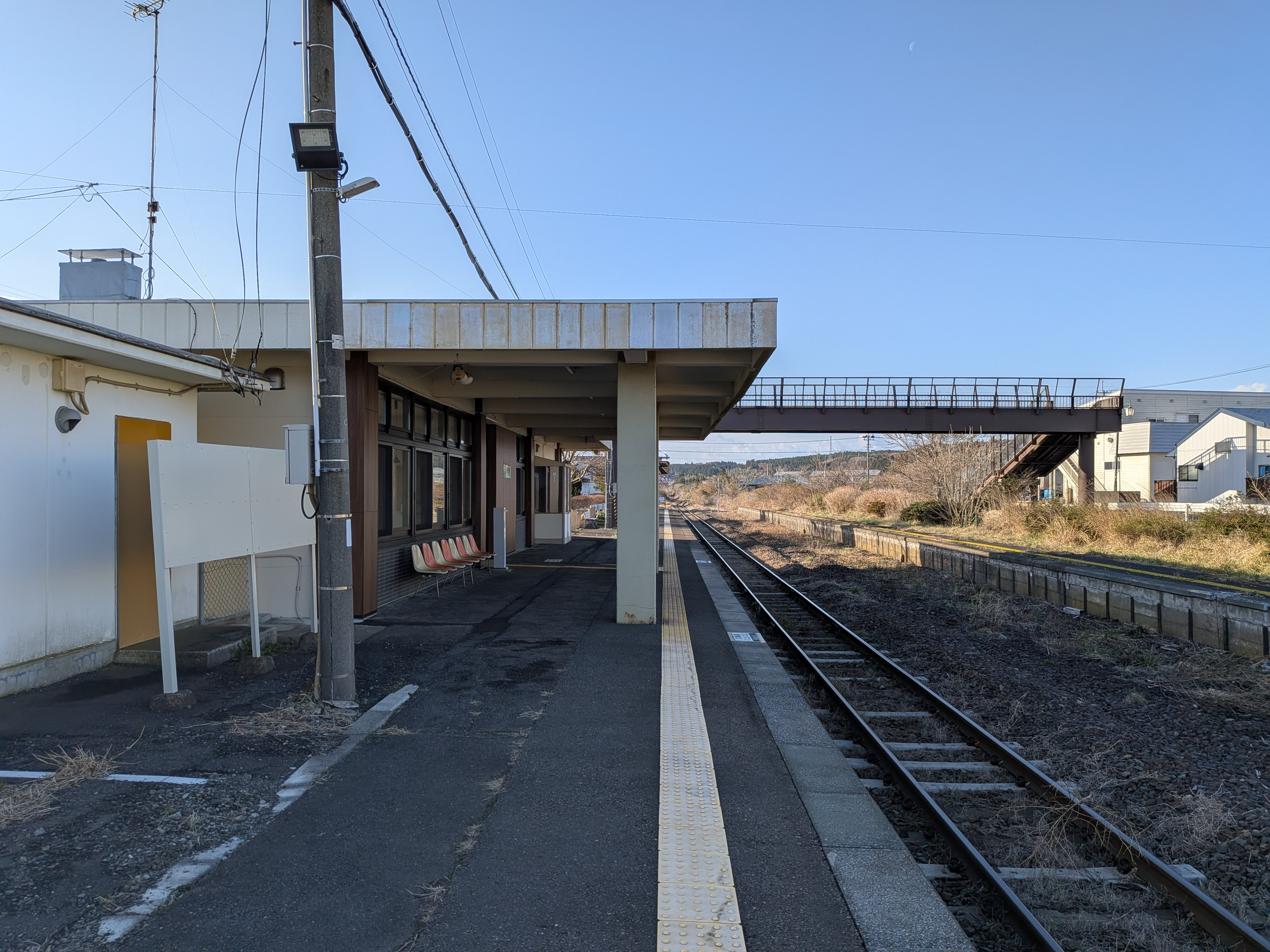
Platform

== History ==
Taneichi Station opened on November 10, 1924. Upon the privatization of the Japanese National Railways (JNR) on April 1, 1987 the station came under the operational control of JR East.

== Passenger statistics ==
In fiscal 2021, the station was used by an average of 89 passengers daily (boarding passengers only).

== Surrounding area ==
- Former Taneichi Town Hall
- Taneichi Post Office
- Taneichi Museum of History and Folklore
- National Route 45

== See also ==
- List of railway stations in Japan
