= Hachinohe Station =

Railway station in Hachinohe, Aomori Prefecture, Japan

Hachinohe Station 八戸駅
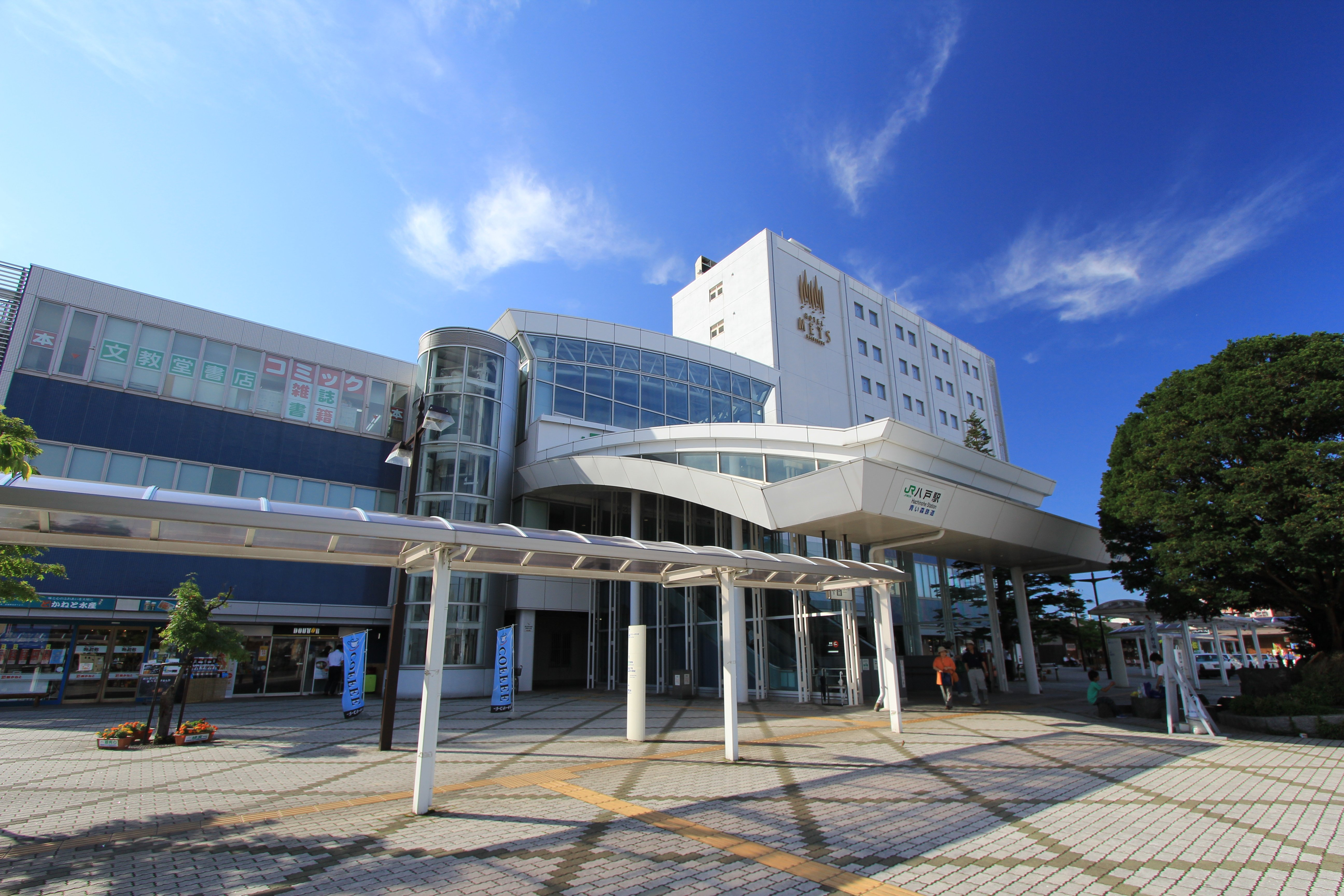
- The east entrance of Hachinohe Station in July 2013

General information
- Location: Shiriuchi, Hachinohe, Aomori Prefecture 039-1101; Japan
- Coordinates: 40.509394°N 141.430736°E
- System: Tōhoku Shinkansen / Regional rail station
- Operator: JR East; Aoimori Railway
- Lines: Tōhoku Shinkansen; Hachinohe Line; ■ Aoimori Railway Line
- Platforms: 1 side + 4 island platforms
- Connections: Bus station

Construction
- Structure type: Elevated

Other information
- Status: Staffed (Midori no Madoguchi)
- Website: Official website

History
- Opened: 1 September 1891; 135 years ago
- Rebuilt: 2002
- Former names: Shiriuchi (until 1971)

Passengers
- FY2015: 4,491 daily (JR East portion only)

Services
Preceding station	JR East	Following station
Ninohe towards Tokyo	Tōhoku Shinkansen Hayabusa	Shichinohe-Towada towards Shin-Aomori
Ninohe towards Morioka	Tōhoku Shinkansen Hayate	Shichinohe-Towada towards Shin-Aomori
Terminus	Hachinohe Line	Naganawashiro towards Kuji
Preceding station	Aoimori Railway	Following station
Terminus	Shimokita	Shimoda towards Noheji
Kitatakaiwa towards Metoki	Aoimori Railway Line	Mutsu-Ichikawa towards Aomori
Location
- Location within Aomori Prefecture Location within Japan

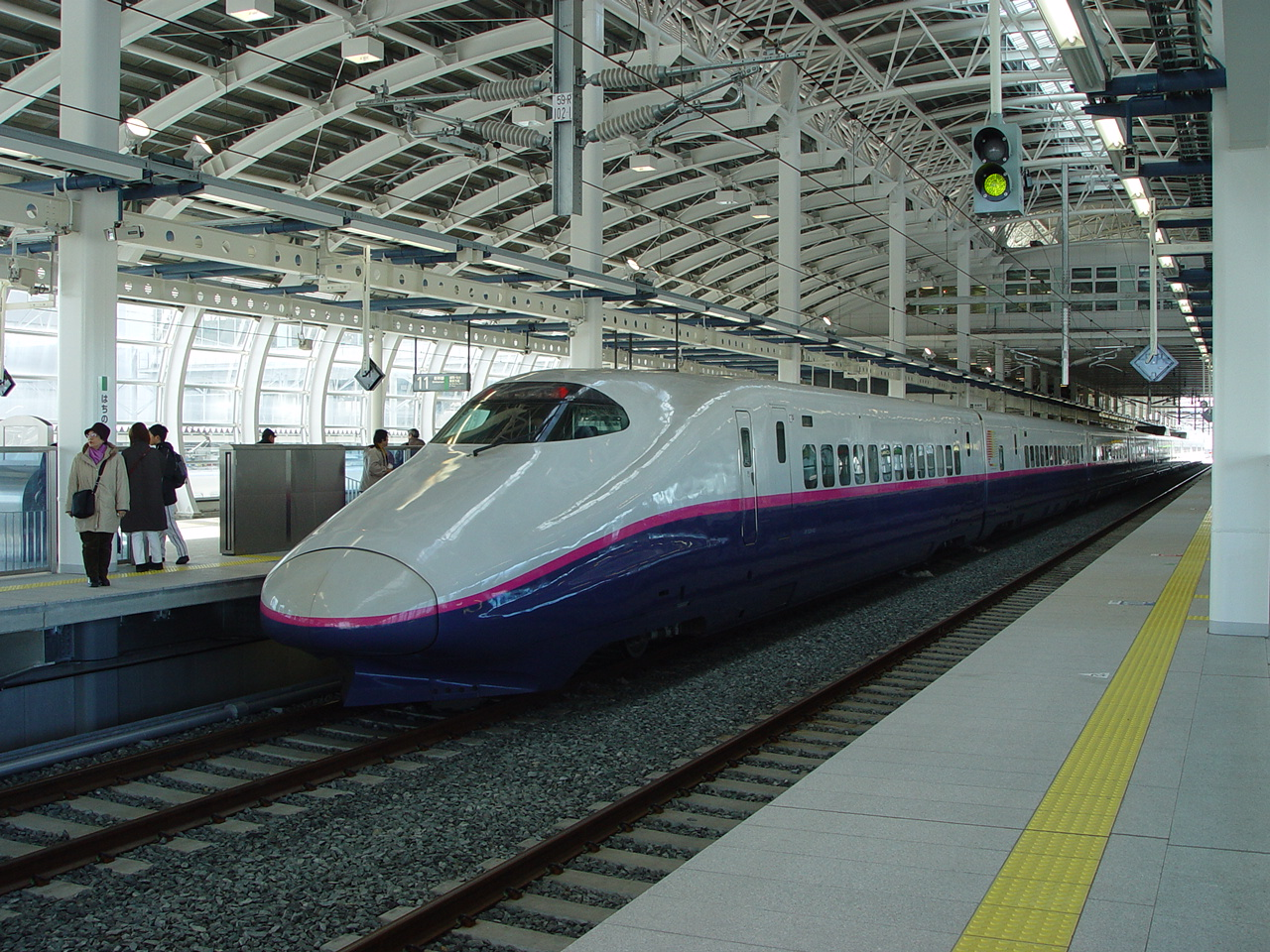
An E2 Series Shinkansen at Hachinohe Station, January 2003

Hachinohe Station (八戸駅, Hachinohe-eki) is a railway station operated by the East Japan Railway Company (JR East) in Hachinohe, Aomori, Japan.

== Lines ==
Hachinohe Station is served by the high-speed Tōhoku Shinkansen line between Tokyo and Shin-Aomori, and forms the starting point of the Hachinohe Line to Kuji. Local services are operated by the third sector Aoimori Railway on the section of the former JR Tōhoku Main Line between Metoki and Aomori. It is one of six principal stations served by the Aoimori Railway Line and is the easternmost high-speed Shinkansen railway station in Japan.

== Station layout ==
Hachinohe is an elevated station with one side platform and two island platforms serving five tracks for regular services, and two island platforms serving four tracks for Tōhoku Shinkansen services. The station has a Midori no Madoguchi staffed ticket office.

=== Platforms ===
1	■ Hachinohe Line	for Hon-Hachinohe, Same, Taneichi, and Kuji
2	■ Hachinohe Line	for Hon-Hachinohe, Same, Taneichi, and Kuji
2	■ Aoimori Railway Line	for Sannohe, Ninohe, and Morioka; Misawa, Noheji, and Aomori
3-5	■ Aoimori Railway Line	for Sannohe, Ninohe, and Morioka; Misawa, Noheji, and Aomori
11/12	■ Tohoku Shinkansen	for Morioka, Sendai, and Tokyo
13/14	■ Tohoku Shinkansen	for Shin-Aomori and Shin-Hakodate-Hokuto

== History ==
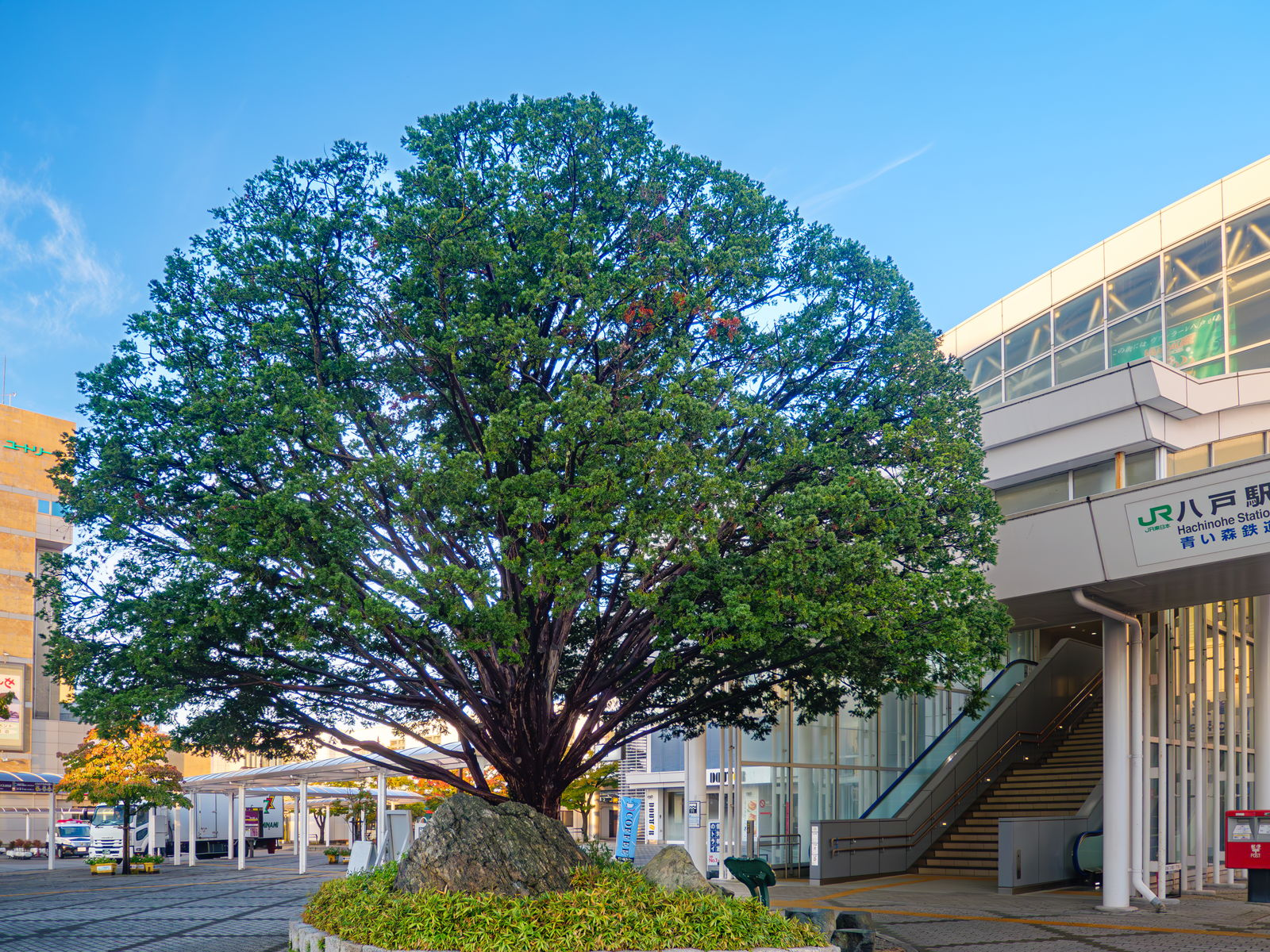
Ichii tree outside the station

The station began operation as Shiriuchi Station (尻内駅) on the Nippon Railway on September 1, 1891. Initially, the construction of a railroad close to the coast was opposed by the Imperial Japanese Army for defensive purposes, so the station was constructed at a considerable distance inland from the town center. The Hachinohe Line began operations on January 4, 1894, from Hachinohe Station. The Nippon Railway was nationalized on November 1, 1906, and Shiriuchi Station became a station on the Japanese Government Railways (JGR), which became the Japanese National Railways (JNR) after World War II. From 1929 to 1969, the now-defunct Nambu Railway also had its terminus at Shiriuchi Station. On April 1, 1971, Shiriuchi Station was renamed Hachinohe Station. The station previously named Hachinohe Station was renamed Hon-Hachinohe Station. Freight operations were transferred to the Hachinohe Freight Terminal later that year and were discontinued completely from 1986. With the privatization of JNR on April 1, 1987, the station came under the operational control of JR East.

A new station building was opened on July 1, 2002, and Tōhoku Shinkansen services began operation from December 12, 2002, with operations of the Tōhoku Main Line from Hachinohe to the border of Iwate Prefecture transferred to the new Aoimori Railway. Following the opening of the Tōhoku Shinkansen extension to Shin-Aomori on December 4, 2010, all Tōhoku Main Line local services through the station were transferred to the Aoimori Railway.

== Passenger statistics ==
In fiscal 2015, the JR East portion of the station was used by an average of 4,491 passengers daily (boarding passengers only).

== Connecting bus routes ==
=== Route buses ===
Boarding area	Operator	Direction	Line / Destination	Notes
1	Hachinohe City bus	Hachinohe Chushingai Terminal（Hachinohe city central）	1: Osugitai bus center; ■ A3・■ S30：Hachinohe city bus Asahigaoka Office; □ C5：Hachinohe Chushingai Terminal（Mikkamachi）; ■ P8：LAPIA	
1	Nanbu bus	Hachinohe Chushingai Terminal（Hachinohe city central）	■ P8：LAPIA; ■ S35：Hachinohe city Hospital; Ferry Terminal	
2	Nanbu bus	Hachinohe Chushingai Terminal（Hachinohe city central）	■ P8：LAPIA	
2	Towada Kankō Electric Railway	Hachinohe Chushingai Terminal（Hachinohe city central）	□ C：Hachinohe Chushingai Terminal（Yōkamachi）/ Hachinohe Office / Hachinohe city Hospital	
3	Hachinohe city bus	Nishi high school	■ N63：Nishi high school	
3	Nanbu bus	Nishi high school	■ T63：Nishi high school	
4	Nanbu bus	Hachinohe newtown・Hassyoku center	45：Korekawa Jomonkan; 71：Sei-Urusula gakuin; 75：Hachinohe newtown; Hassyoku 100yen bus	
5	Nanbu bus	Gonohe・Karumai	140：Gonohe(chuō); ■ G140：Gonohe station; Karumai hospital	
5	Towada Kankō Electric Railway	Towada city	■ K：Towadashi	

=== Highway buses ===
- Sirius; For Ikebukuro Station and Tokyo Station
- Shimokita; For Ōmiya Station (Saitama) and Shinjuku Station
- Enburi; For Shinjuku Station and Tokyo Station
- For Karumai

== Surrounding area ==
- Hachinohe Station building "Umineko plaza"
  - Hotel Mets Hachinohe
- Hachinohe area stockbroker Sangho Shinko center "Yutori"
  - Hachinohe-Ekimae post office
- Hachinohe Red Cross hospital
- Flat Hachinohe (indoor ice arena)

== See also ==
- List of railway stations in Japan
