= Kuji Station (Iwate) =

Railway station in Kuji, Iwate Prefecture, Japan

Kuji Station 久慈駅
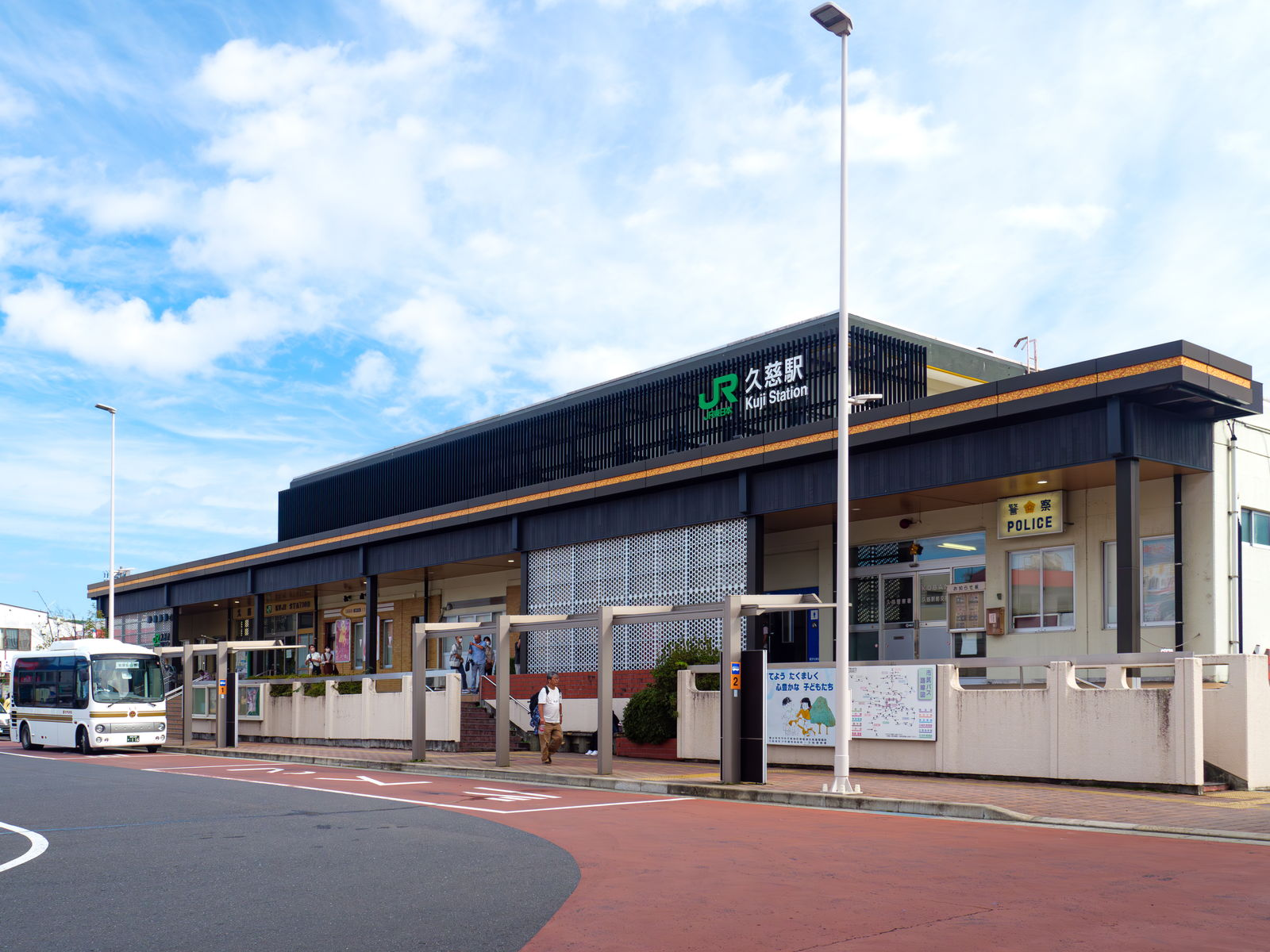
- JR Kuji Station in February 2024

General information
- Location: 3-39-3 Chuo, Kuji-shi, Iwate-ken 028-0051; Japan
- Coordinates: 40°11′26″N 141°46′15″E
- Operator: JR East; Sanriku Railway
- Lines: ■ Hachinohe Line; ■ Rias Line
- Platforms: 1 island platform
- Tracks: 2
- Connections: Bus stop

Construction
- Structure type: At grade

Other information
- Status: Staffed (Midori no Madoguchi)

History
- Opened: 27 March 1930

Passengers
- FY2015: 269 (JR East), 499 (Sanriku) daily

Services
Preceding station	JR East	Following station
Rikuchū-Natsui towards Hachinohe	Hachinohe Line	Terminus
Preceding station	Sanriku Railway	Following station
Rikuchū-Ube towards Sakari	Rias Line	Terminus
Location
- Location within Japan

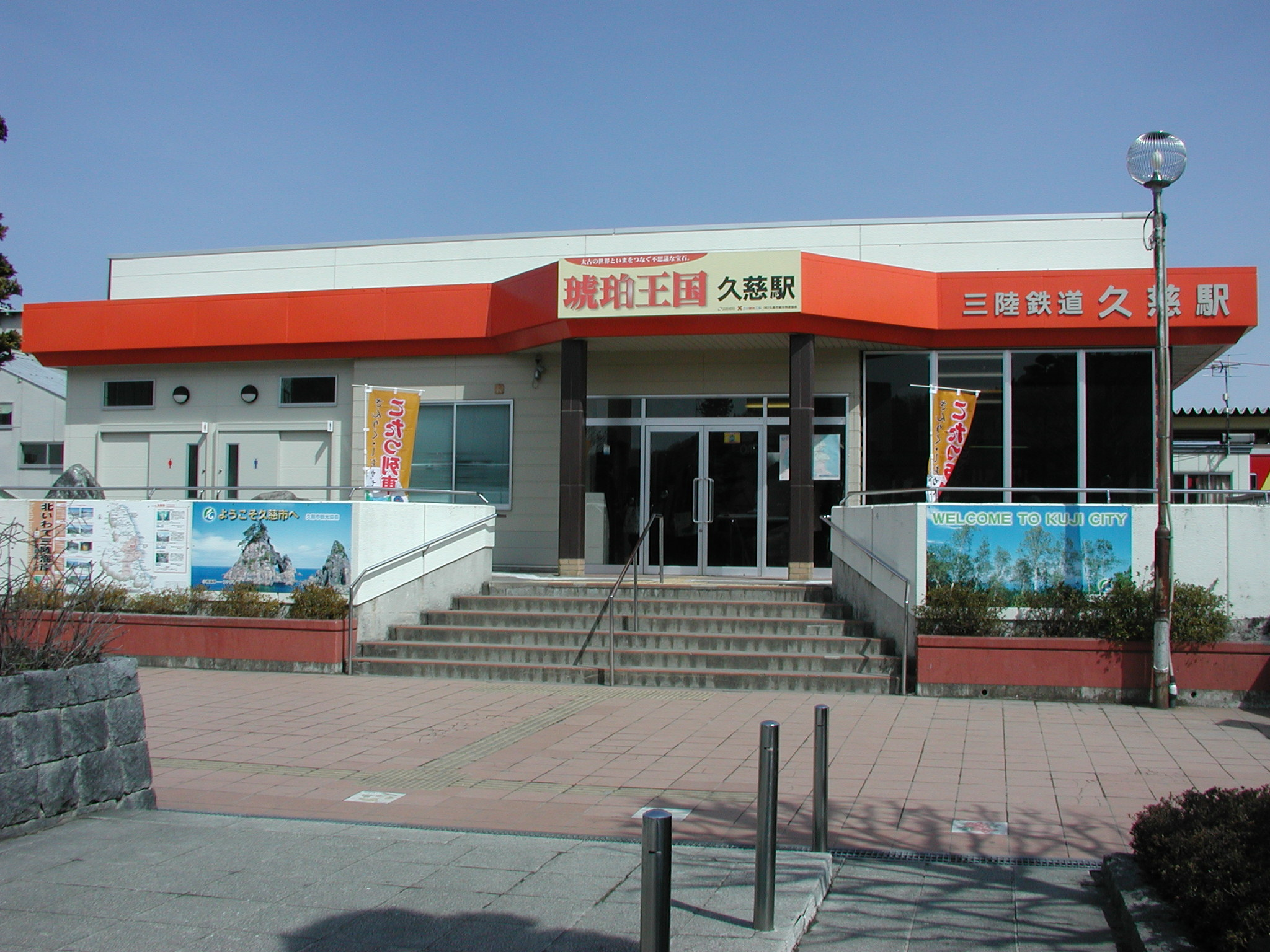
Sanriku Kuji Station in March 2010

Kuji Station (久慈駅, Kuji-eki) is a railway station on the Hachinohe Line in the city of Kuji, Iwate, Japan, operated by East Japan Railway Company (JR East).

== Lines ==
Kuji Station a terminal station on the Hachinohe Line, and is located 64.9 kilometers from the opposing terminus of the line at Hachinohe Station. It is also a terminal station for the Sanriku Railway Rias Line and is 163.0 kilometers from the opposing terminus at Sakari Station.

== Station layout ==
Kuji Station has a single island platform connected to the station building by a footbridge. The station has a Midori no Madoguchi staffed ticket office. The side of the platform used by the Sanriku Railway is also used by three starting trains per day on the Hachinohe Line.

=== Platforms ===
1	■ Hachinohe Line	for Taneichi and Hachinohe
2	■ Rias Line	for Miyako, Kamaishi, and Sakari
2	■ Hachinohe Line	for Taneichi and Hachinohe

== Route bus ==
- JR Bus Tohoku
  - For Ninohe Station (Tōhoku Shinkansen Relay Bus "Swallow")
  - For Morioka Station via Rikuchū-Yamagata, Kuzumai and Numakunai (Express Bus "Shirakaba")
- Northern Iwate Transportation
  - For Morioka Station, Morioka Bus Center (Express Bus "Kuji Kohaku")
  - For Tokyo Dome Hotel, Tokyo Station, Roppongi Hills, Tamachi Station (Express Bus "Iwate Kizuna", with Fuji Express)

== History ==
Kuji Station opened on 27 March 1930. The station became a terminal station for the Kuji Line on 20 July 1976. This line was privatized on 1 April 1984, becoming the Sanriku Railway Kita-Rias Line. Kuji Station was absorbed into the JR East network upon the privatization of the Japanese National Railways (JNR) on 1 April 1987. The 2011 Tōhoku earthquake and tsunami on 11 March 2011 destroyed much of the tracks and many stations on both the Hachinohe Line and the Sanriku Railway. However, the Sanriku Railway resumed operations to Rikuchū-Noda Station by 16 March and to Tanohata Station by 1 April 2012. The Hachinohe Line resumed operations on 17 March 2012. Minami-Rias Line, a segment of Yamada Line, and Kita-Rias Line constitute Rias Line on 23 March 2019. Accordingly, this station became a terminus station of Rias Line.

== Passenger statistics ==
In fiscal 2015, the JR East portion of the station was used by an average of 269 passenger daily (boarding passengers only).

== Surrounding area ==
- Kuji Post office

== See also ==
- List of railway stations in Japan
