= Kitanuma Station =

Freight station in Hachinohe, Japan

Coordinates: 40°33′19.4″N 141°29′1.7″E

Kitanuma Station (北沼駅, Kitanuma-eki) is a freight station on Hachinohe Rinkai Railway Line in Hachinohe, Aomori, Japan. This station is the terminal station of the line. Industrial railway connects this station and Mitsubishi Paper Co. factory.

== Surrounding area ==
- Mitsubishi Paper Mills Limited Hachinohe Factory (三菱製紙(株))
- Hachinohe Seiren Co. (八戸精錬(株))

== History ==
- 25 March 1966 Open as a station of Aomori Prefecture Industrial Railway.
- 1 December 1970 Inherited by Hachinohe Rinkai Railway

== Adjacent stations ==
Hachinohe Rinkai Railway
Hachinohe Rinkai Railway Line

Hachinohe Freight Station - Kitanuma Station

== See also ==
- List of railway stations in Japan
