= Miyagi Park =

City park in Hachinohe, Japan

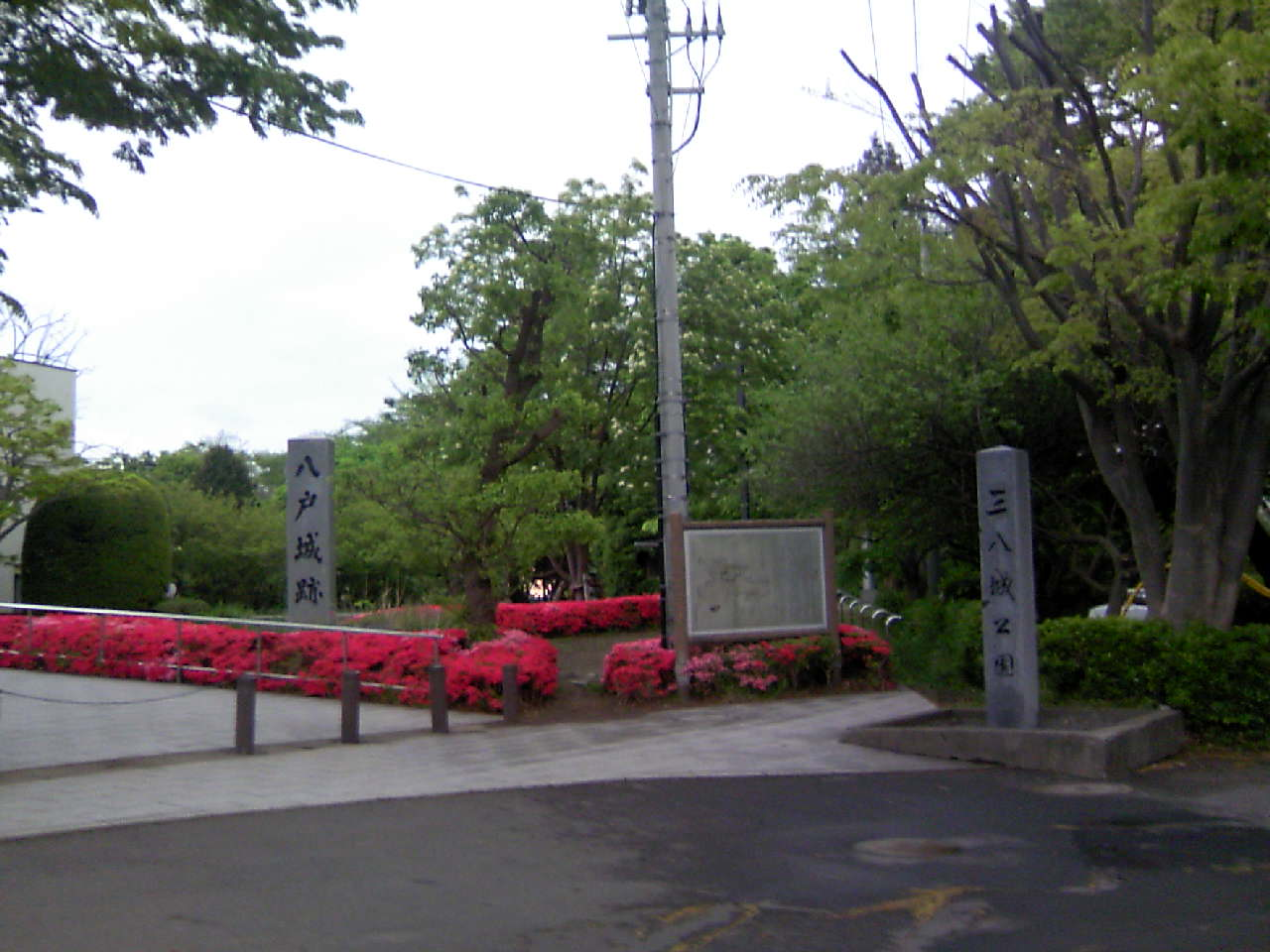
- The park entrance of Miyagi Park
- Interactive map of Miyagi Park
- Location: Uchimaru, Hachinohe, Japan
- Coordinates: 40°30′53.1″N 141°29′16.3″E
- Area: 1.6 ha (4.0 acres)
- Public transit: Hachinohe Line – Hon-Hachinohe Station

Miyagi Park (三八城公園, Miyagi kōen) is an urban park in the city of Hachinohe, Japan, located in the central part of the city. It is located on the former grounds of Hachinohe Castle. The park has an observation deck, a playground, and about 50 cherry trees.
