= Hon-Hachinohe Station =

Railway station in Hachinohe, Aomori Prefecture, Japan

Hon-Hachinohe Station 本八戸駅
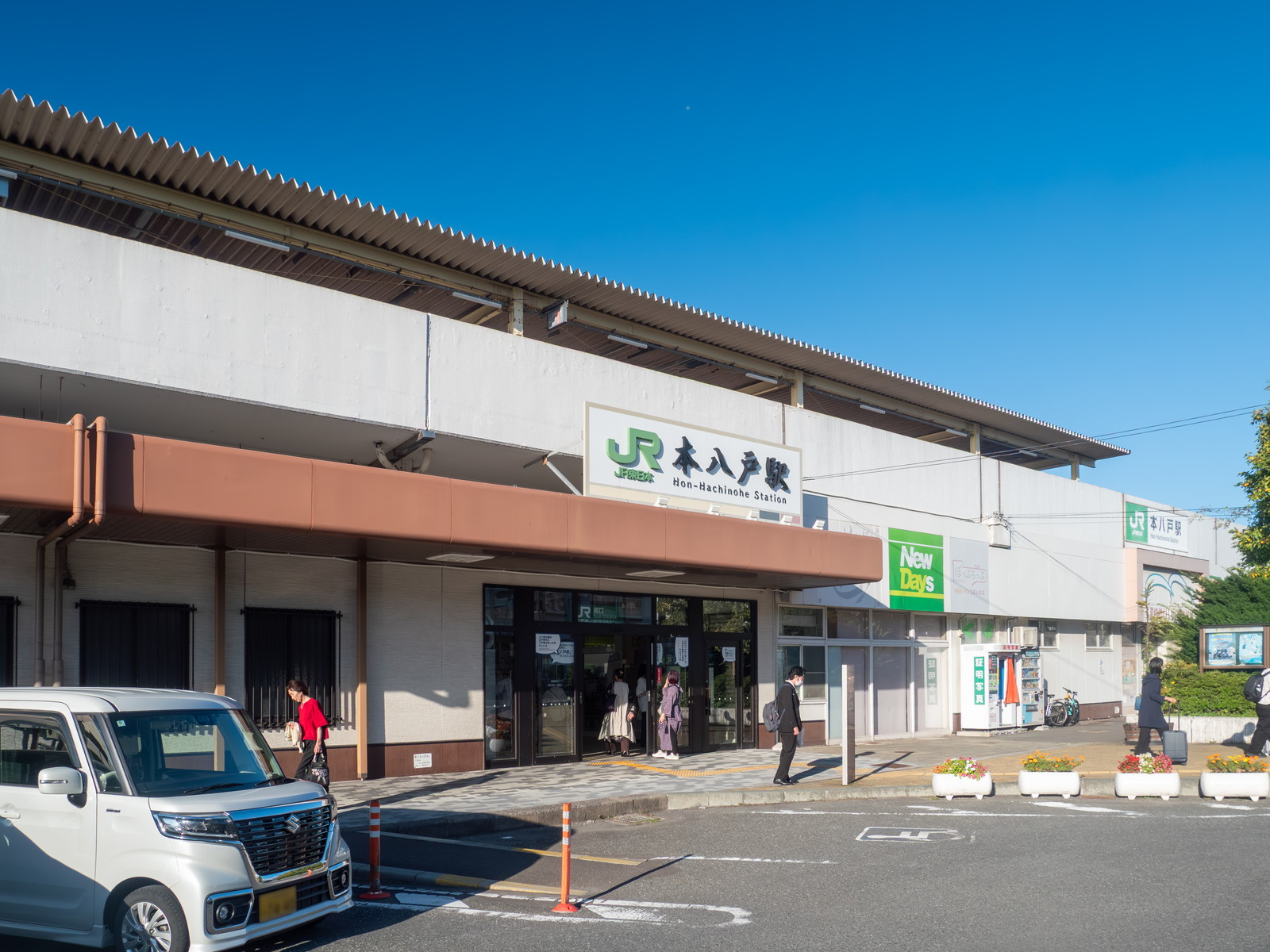
- Hon-Hachinohe Station in September 2025

General information
- Location: 1-16-7 Uchimaru, Hachinohe-shi, Aomori-ken 031-0075; Japan
- Coordinates: 40°30′58.68″N 141°29′20.26″E
- Operator: JR East
- Line: ■ Hachinohe Line
- Distance: 5.5 km from Hachinohe
- Platforms: 1 island platform
- Tracks: 2

Other information
- Status: Staffed, Midori no Madoguchi
- Website: Official website

History
- Opened: 4 January 1898
- Former names: Hachinohe (until 1971)

Passengers
- FY2020: 843 daily

Services
| Preceding station | JR East | Following station |
|---|---|---|
| Naganawashiro towards Hachinohe | Hachinohe Line | Konakano towards Kuji |
Location
- Location within Aomori Prefecture Location within Japan

Hon-Hachinohe Station (本八戸駅, Hon-Hachinohe-eki) is a passenger railway station located in the city of Hachinohe, Aomori Prefecture, Japan. It is operated by the East Japan Railway Company (JR East). The station is also officially listed as a freight depot of the Japan Freight Railway Company (JR Freight), although no freight trains depart or arrive here, and the Hon-Hachinohe Station Freight Handling Station (which was at the end of a line that branches off from the Hachinohe Line between Naganaeshiro Station and Hon-Hachinohe Station, and runs about 500m north along the Mabechi River) ceased operations in June 2006,

== Lines ==
Hon-Hachinohe Station is served by the Hachinohe Line, and is 5.5 kilometers from the starting point of the line at Hachinohe Station.

== Station layout ==
The station has single elevated island platform serving two tracks with the station building located underneath. The station has a Midori no Madoguchi staffed ticket office as well as automatic ticket machines.

=== Platforms ===
| 1 | ■ Hachinohe Line | for Hachinohe |
| 2 | ■ Hachinohe Line | for Same and Kuji |

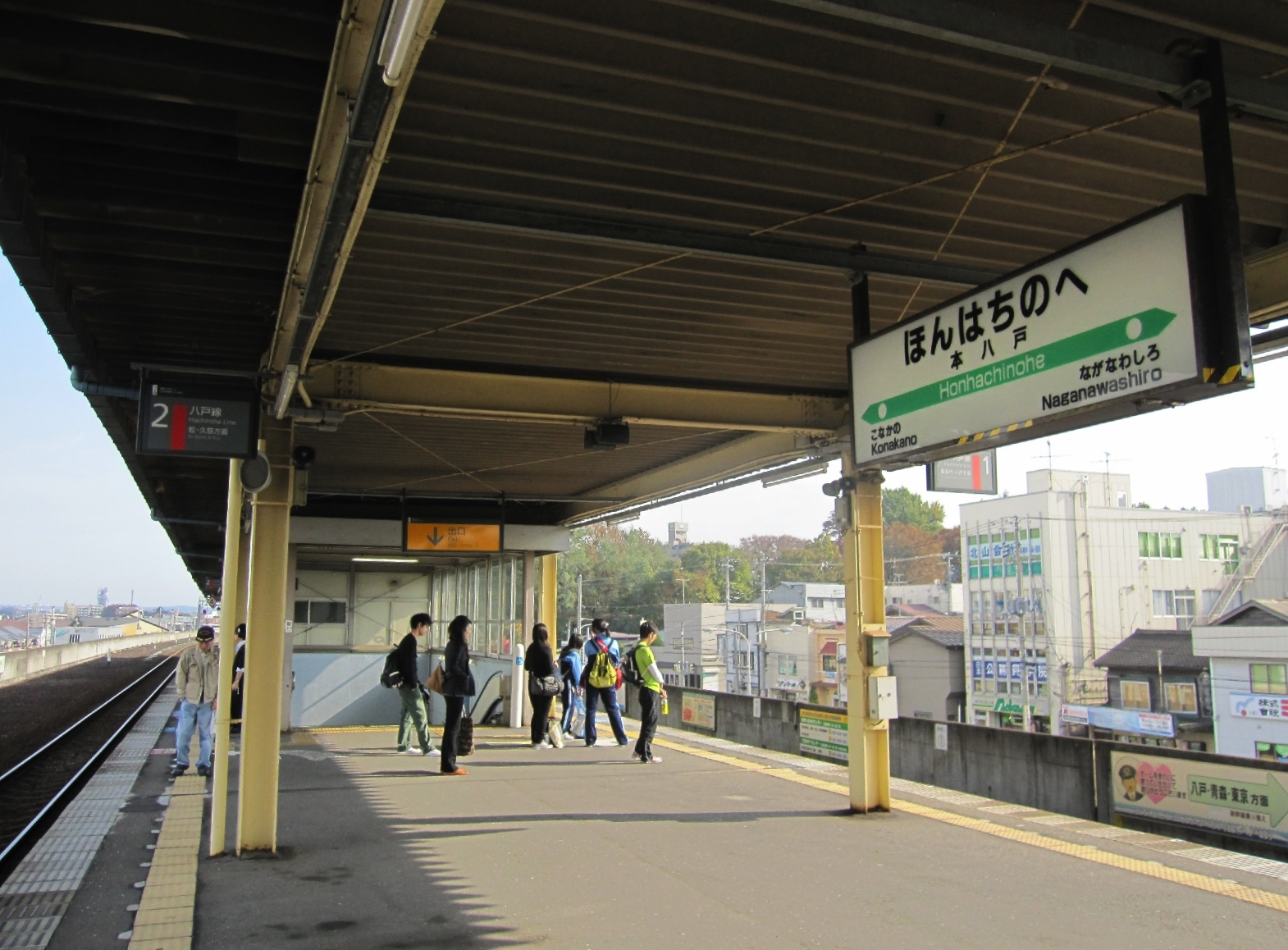
The platform in October 2011

== History ==
The station opened on January 4, 1898, as Hachinohe Station (八ノ戸駅) on the Nippon Railway. The Nippon Railway was nationalized on November 1, 1906, becoming part of the Japanese Government Railways (JGR), and a year later, on November 1, 1907, the station was renamed Hachinohe Station (八戸駅). The JGR became the Japanese National Railways (JNR) after World War II. In 1971, Shiriuchi Station (尻内駅, Shiriuchi-eki) on the Tohoku Main Line was renamed "Hachinohe Station", and the original Hachinohe Station was renamed "Hon-Hachinohe". The station building was elevated and completely rebuilt in 1977. With the privatization of JNR on April 1, 1987, it came under the operational control of JR East.

The station was again rebuilt from December 2014, with work completed on 31 July 2015.

== Passenger statistics ==
In fiscal 2020, the station was used by an average of 843 passengers daily (boarding passengers only).

== Surrounding area ==
- Hachinohe City Hall
- Miyagi Park
  - Hachinohe Castle

== See also ==
- List of railway stations in Japan
