= Hachinohe Freight Terminal =

- Interactive map of Hachinohe Freight Terminal

Location
- Location: Hachinohe, Aomori, Japan
- Coordinates: 40°31′14″N 141°26′41″E

Details
- Built: 1970
- Operated by: Japan Freight Railway Company
- Rail lines: Tōhoku Main Line; Hachinohe Line; Hachinohe Rinkai Railway Line

Hachinohe Freight Terminal (八戸貨物駅, Hachinohe-Kamotsu-eki) is a freight terminal in Hachinohe, Aomori, Japan, operated by Japan Freight Railway Company (JR Freight).

== Lines ==
Hachinohe Freight Terminal is used by freight trains on the Tōhoku Main Line and Hachinohe Line. The terminal is also used by trains operating to and from the Hachinohe Rinkai Railway Line.

== History ==
The terminal opened on 1 December 1970 as a junction of Japanese National Railways (JNR) and the Hachinohe Rinkai Railway. Following privatization on 1 April 1987, the terminal was transferred from JNR to JR Freight ownership.

== See also ==
- List of railway stations in Japan
