= Yomasari Dam =

Dam in Aomori Prefecture, Japan

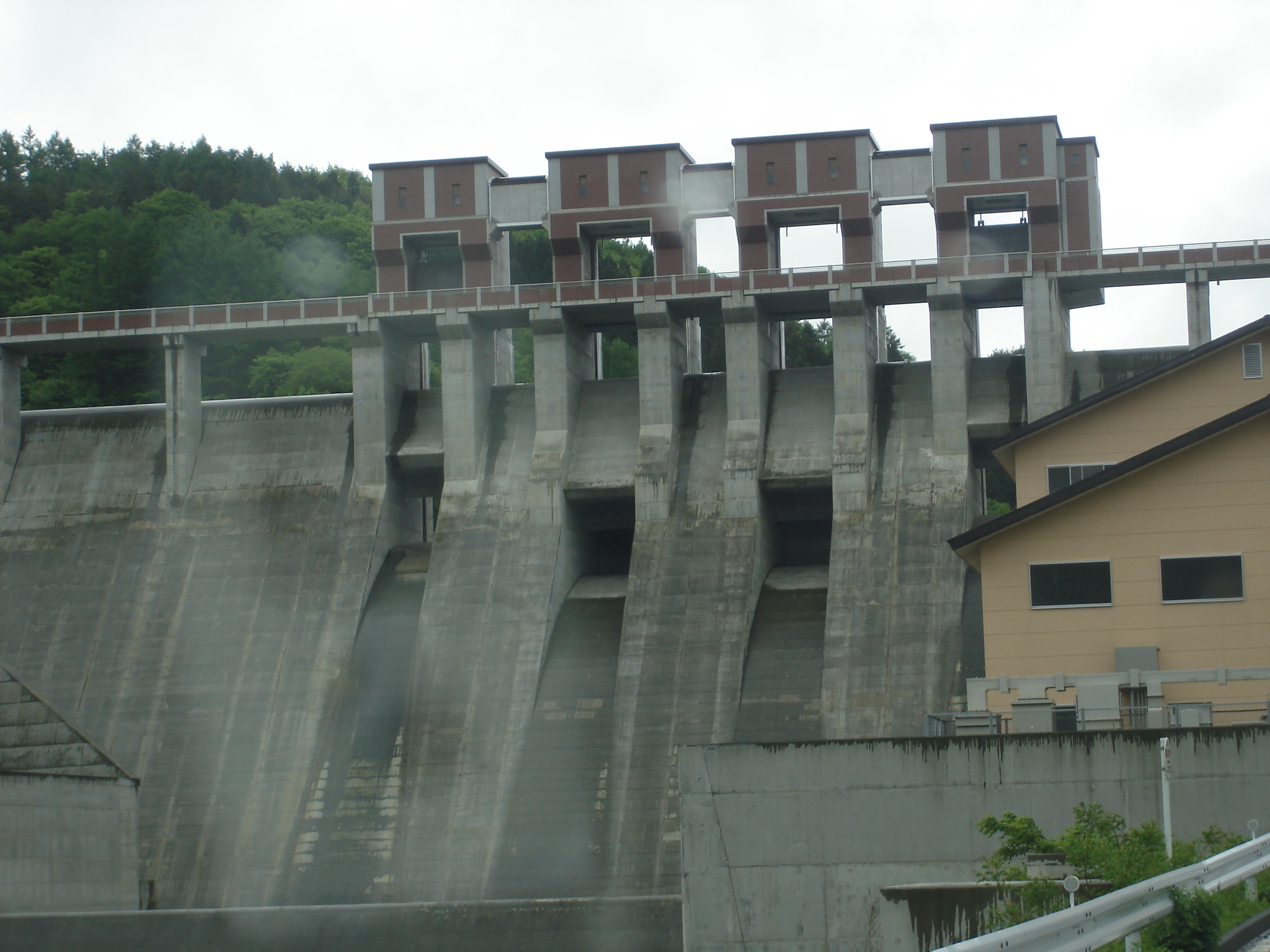

- Location within Aomori Prefecture Location within Japan
- Official name: 世増ダム
- Location: Hachinohe, Aomori, Japan
- Coordinates: 40°23′25″N 141°28′50″E
- Construction began: 1976
- Opening date: 2003
- Operator: Ministry of Agriculture, Forestry and Fisheries (Japan)

Dam and spillways
- Impounds: Niida River
- Height: 52 m (171 ft)
- Length: 247 m (810 ft)

Reservoir
- Creates: Lake Aoba
- Total capacity: 36,500,000 m^{3}
- Catchment area: 398 km^{2}
- Surface area: 180 hectares (440 acres)

The Yomasari Dam (世増ダム, Yomasari damu) is a dam on the Niida River, located in the city of Hachinohe, Aomori Prefecture in the Tōhoku region of northern Honshū, Japan.

== History ==
Yomasari Dam was designed as a multi-purpose dam, to provide for flood control in the event of heavy rains or typhoons, which had potential to flood downtown Hachinohe. The reservoir created was intended to provide water for tap water, as well as agricultural and industrial purposes, and to create a new recreational area for fishing and boating for the residents of Hachinohe. However, there is no hydroelectric power station associated with the dam.

Preliminary design work began on the Yomasari Dam in 1976, with main construction beginning in 1989, and was completed by 2003 by a consortium of the Obayashi Corporation, Sumitomo Mitsui Construction, and Tekken Corporation.

== Design ==
The Yomasari Dam is a hollow-core concrete gravity dam with several central spillways.
