= Hachinohe Institute of Technology =

Coordinates: 40°28′41″N 141°33′45″E

- 八戸工業大学
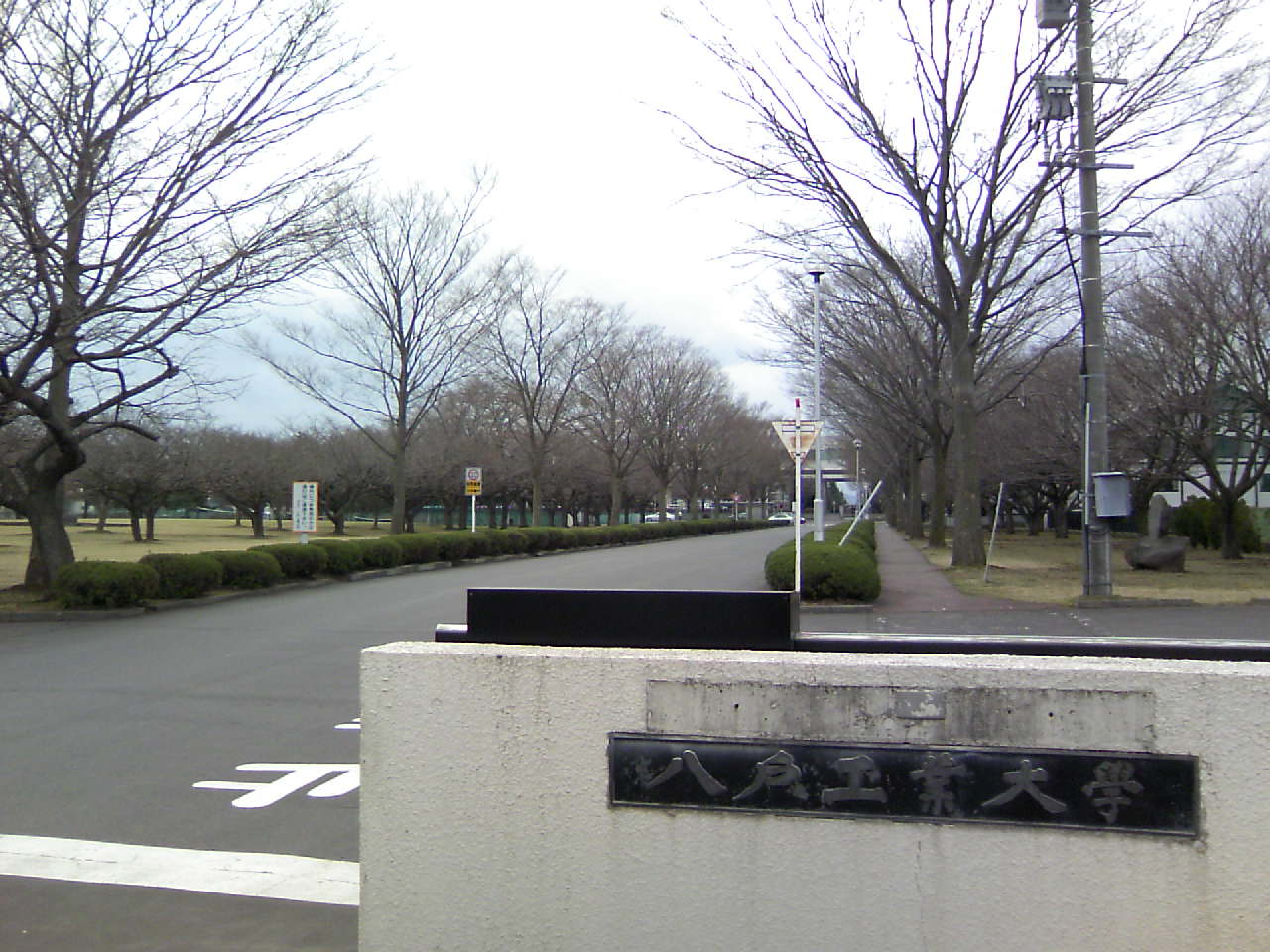
- The main gate of Hachinohe Institute of Technology
- Type: Private
- Established: 1972
- President: Akira Hasegawa
- Location: Hachinohe, Aomori, Japan
- Website: Official website

Hachinohe Institute of Technology (八戸工業大学, Hachinohe kōgyō daigaku) is a private university located in the city of Hachinohe, Aomori Prefecture, Japan, established in 1972.

== Departments and graduate school programs ==
=== Departments ===
- Department of Mechanical Engineering
- Department of Electric and Electronic Systems
- Department of System and Information Engineering
- Department of Biotechnology and Environmental Engineering
- Department of Civil Engineering and Architecture
- Department of Kansei Design

=== Graduate school programs ===
- Doctor of Engineering Program in Mechanical and Biochemical Engineering
- Doctor of Engineering Program in Electronic, Electrical and Information Engineering
- Doctor of Engineering Program in Civil Engineering
- Doctor of Engineering Program in Architectural Engineering
