= Konakano Station =

Railway station in Hachinohe, Aomori Prefecture, Japan

Konakano Station 小中野駅
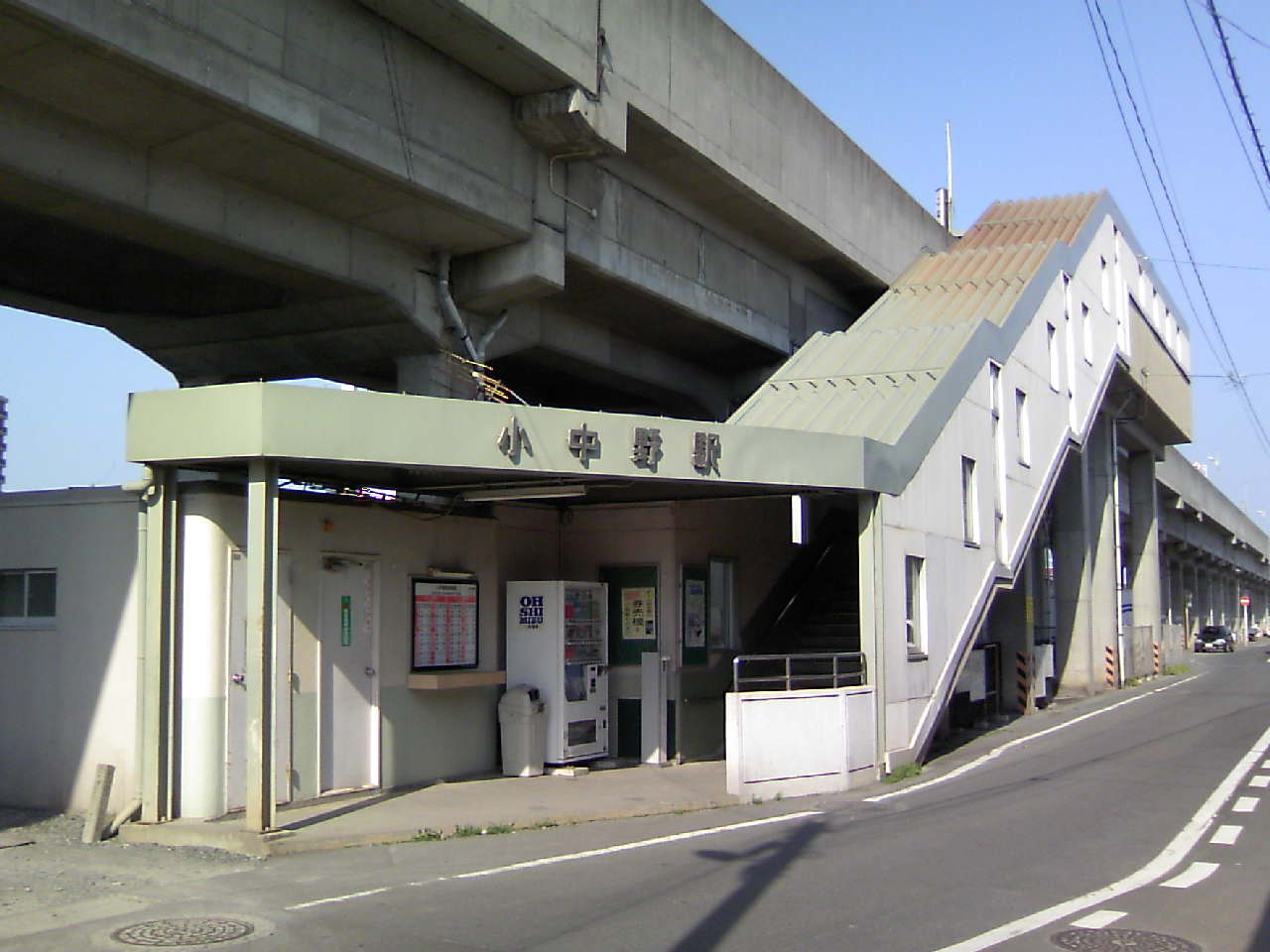
- Konakano Station in April 2007

General information
- Location: 4-4 Konakano, Hachinohe-shi, Aomori-ken 031-0802; Japan
- Coordinates: 40°31′7.35″N 141°30′36.94″E
- Operator: JR East
- Line: ■ Hachinohe Line
- Distance: 7.3 km from Hachinohe
- Platforms: 1 side platform
- Tracks: 1

Other information
- Status: Unstaffed
- Website: Official website

History
- Opened: June 1, 1934

Services
Preceding station	JR East	Following station
Hon-Hachinohe towards Hachinohe	Hachinohe Line	Mutsuminato towards Kuji
Location
- Location within Aomori Prefecture Location within Japan

Konakano Station (小中野駅, Konakano-eki) is a passenger railway station located in the city of Hachinohe, Aomori Prefecture, Japan, operated by East Japan Railway Company (JR East).

== Lines ==
Konakano Station is served by the Hachinohe Line, and is 7.3 kilometers from the starting point of the line at Hachinohe Station.

== Station layout ==
The station has a single elevated side platform serving one bi-directional track, with the station building located underneath. The station is unattended.

== History ==
Konakano Station opened on June 1, 1934, as a station on the Japanese Government Railways (JGR). With the privatization of Japanese National Railways (JNR, the successor to JGR) on April 1, 1987, it came under the operational control of JR East.

== Surrounding area ==
- Hachinohe Omachi Post Office

== See also ==
- List of railway stations in Japan
