= Mutsuminato Station =

Railway station in Hachinohe, Aomori Prefecture, Japan

Mutsuminato Station 陸奥湊駅
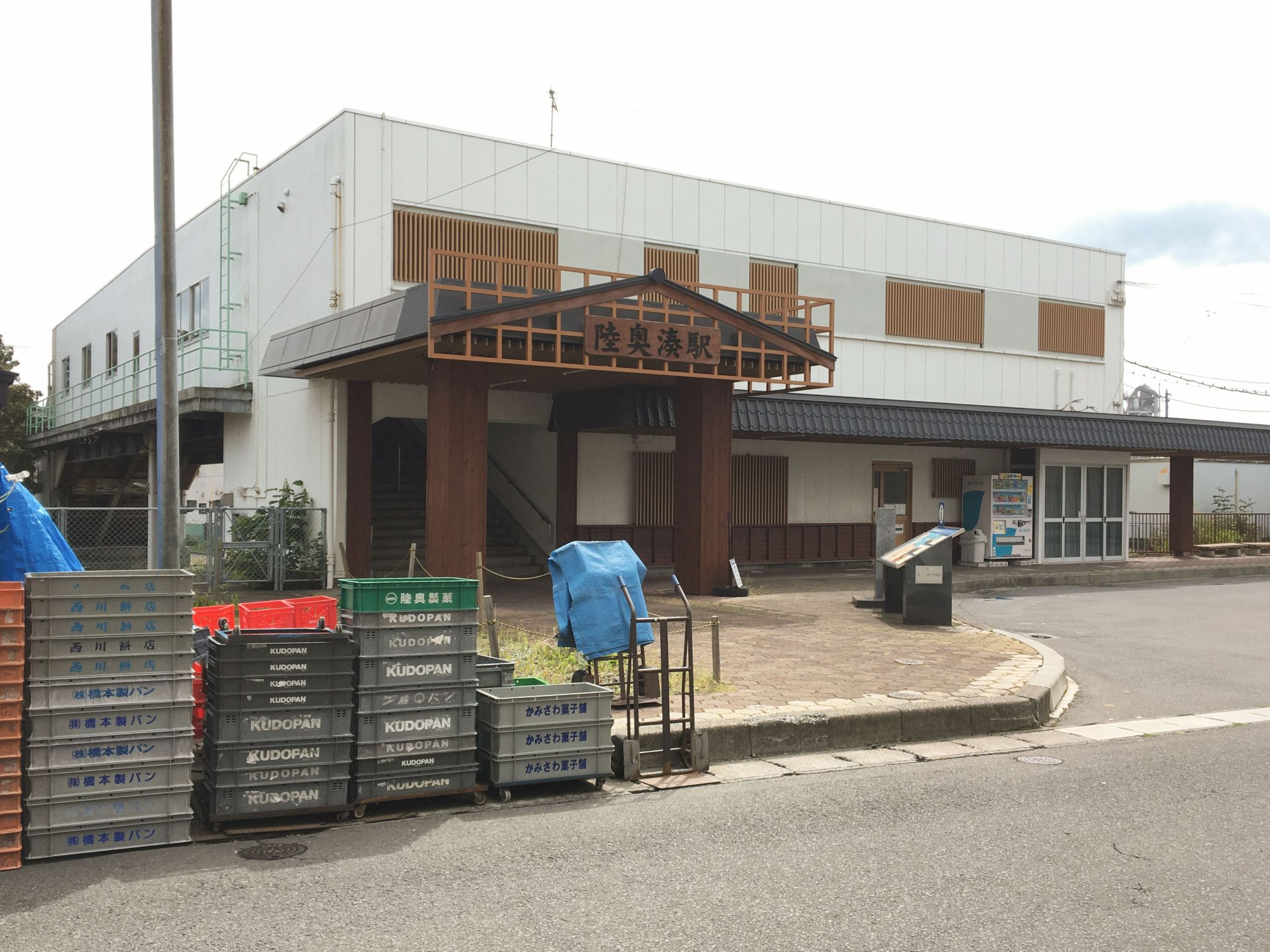
- Mutsuminato Station north entrance in 2022

General information
- Location: 44-1 Minato-cho Kubo, Hachinohe-shi, Aomori-ken 031-0812; Japan
- Coordinates: 40°31′23.88″N 141°31′39.75″E
- Operator: JR East
- Line: ■ Hachinohe Line
- Distance: 9.0 km from Hachinohe
- Platforms: 1 island platform
- Tracks: 2

Construction
- Structure type: Elevated

Other information
- Status: Unstaffed station (Automatic ticket vending machine installation)
- Website: Official website

History
- Opened: 11 July 1925

Passengers
- FY2018: 134 daily

Services
Preceding station	JR East	Following station
Konakano towards Hachinohe	Hachinohe Line	Shirogane towards Kuji
Location
- Location within Aomori Prefecture Location within Japan

Mutsuminato Station (陸奥湊駅, Mutsuminato-eki) is a passenger railway station located in the city of Hachinohe, Aomori Prefecture, Japan. It is operated by East Japan Railway Company (JR East).

== Lines ==
Mutsuminato Station is served by the Hachinohe Line, and is 9.0 kilometers from the starting point of the line at Hachinohe Station.

== Station layout ==
The station has one ground-level island platform serving two tracks, with an elevated station building. The station is unattended and has an automated ticket machines.

=== Platforms ===
1	■ Hachinohe Line	for Same, Taneichi, and Kuji
2	■ Hachinohe Line	for Hachinohe

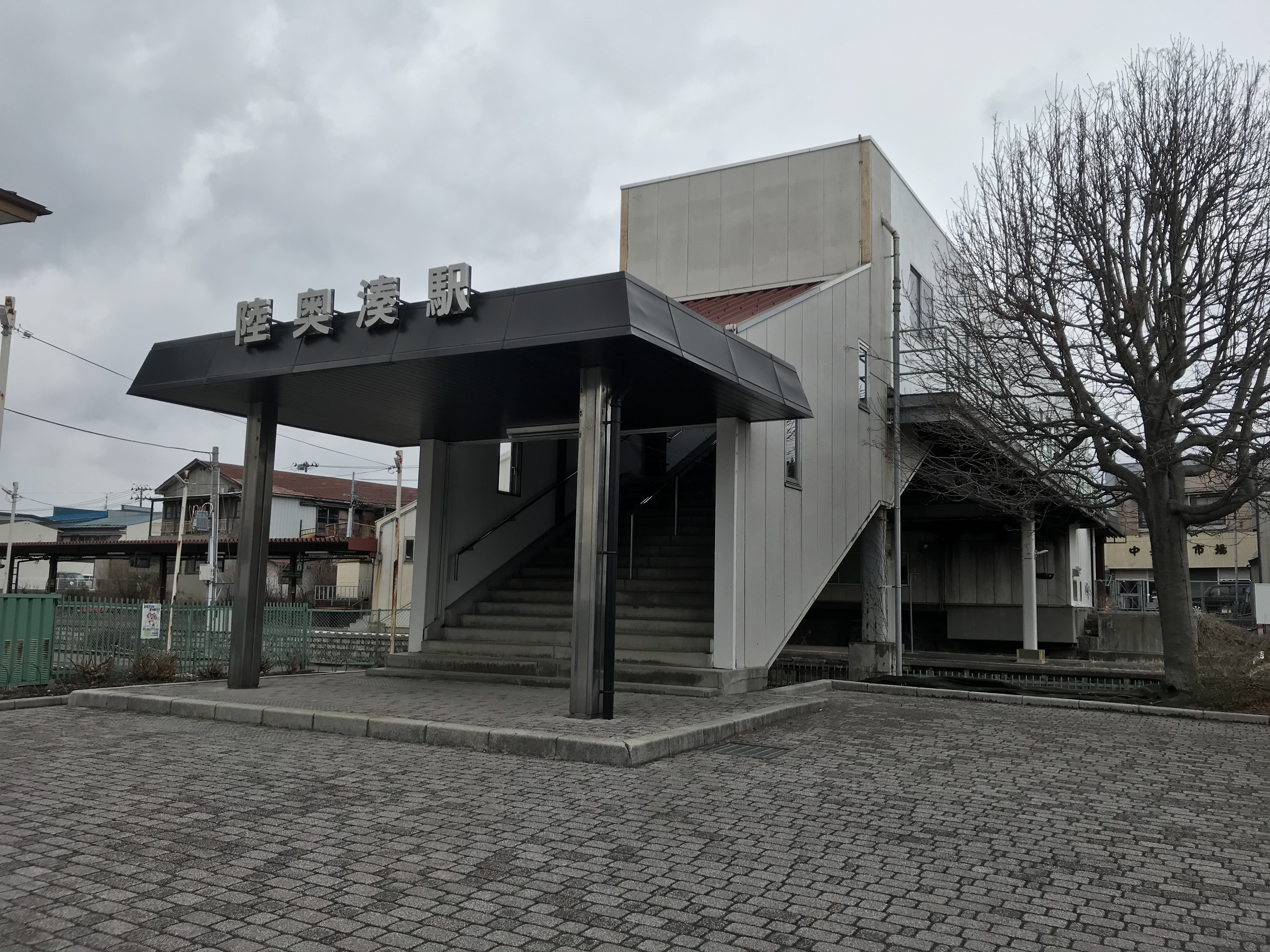
South exit

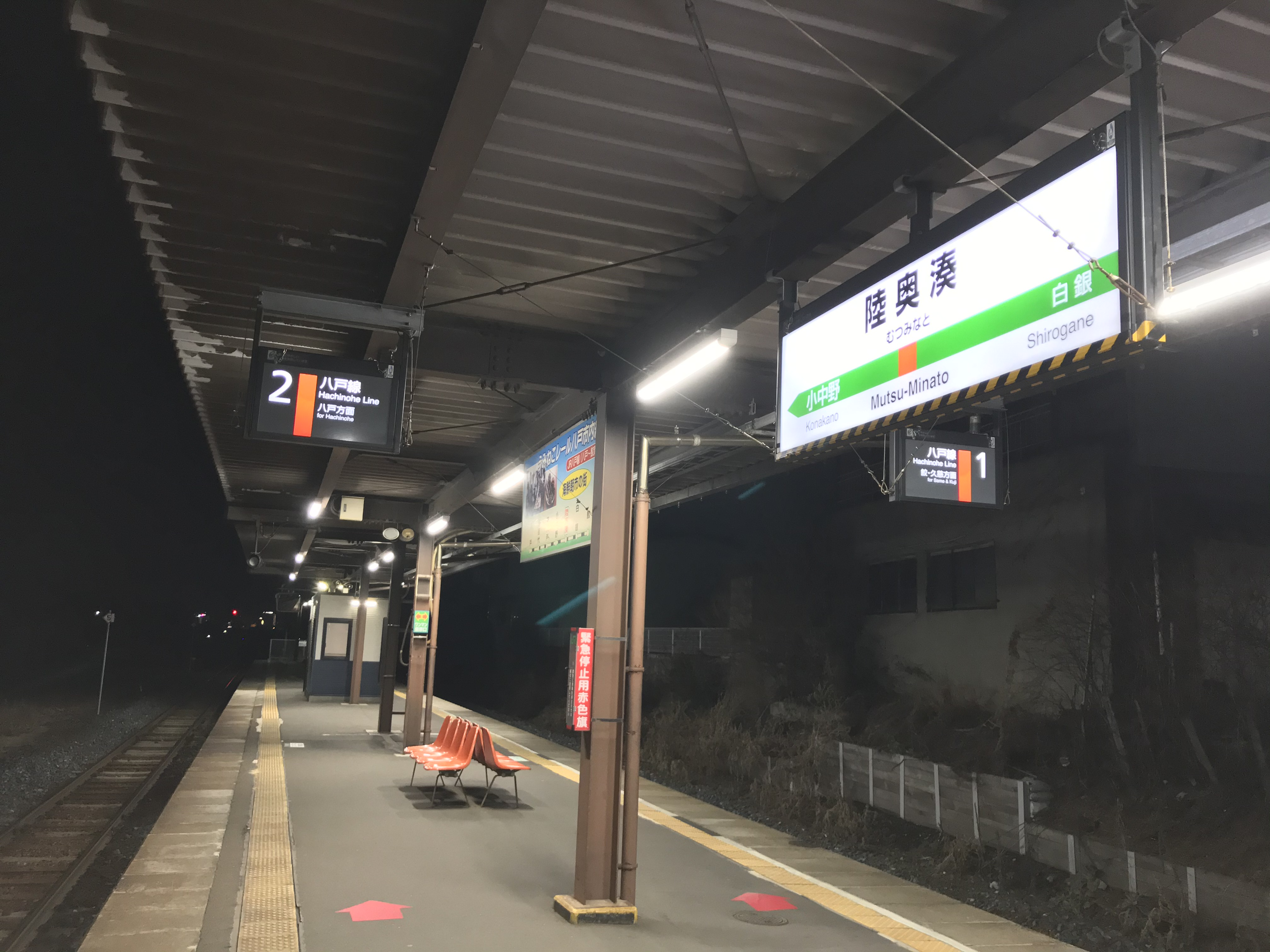
Platform

== History ==
Mutsuminato Station opened on July 11, 1926, as a station on the Japanese Government Railways (JGR). A freight spur line to nearby Iwaki Cement (now part of Sumitomo Cement) was opened in 1927; the spur line was closed in 1986. With the privatization of the Japanese National Railways (JNR, the post-war successor to the JGR) on April 1, 1987, the station came under the operational control of JR East.

== Passenger statistics ==
In fiscal 2018, the station was used by an average of 134 passengers daily (boarding passengers only).

== Surrounding area ==
- Port of Hachinohe

== See also ==
- List of railway stations in Japan
