= Hachinohe Rinkai Railway Line =

Railway line in Japan

Hachinohe Rinkai Line
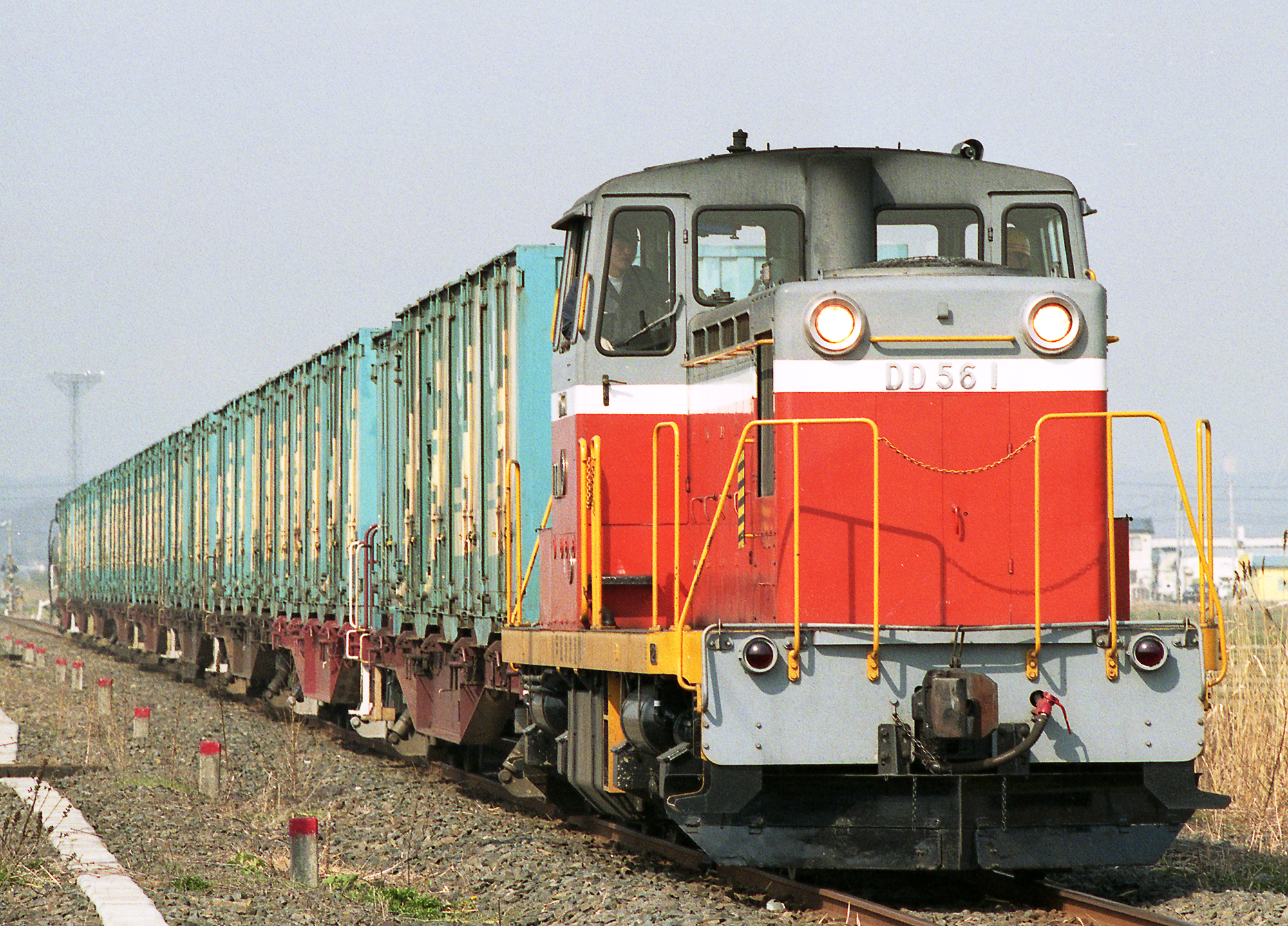
- DD56 diesel locomotive

Overview
- Owner: Aomori Prefecture
- Locale: Aomori Prefecture, Japan
- Termini: Hachinohe Freight Terminal; Kitanuma
- Stations: 2

Service
- Type: Heavy rail (freight)
- Operator: Hachinohe Rinkai Tetsudō

History
- Opened: March 25, 1966

Technical
- Line length: 8.5 km (5.3 mi)
- Track gauge: 3 ft 6 in (1,067 mm)
- Electrification: None

The Hachinohe Rinkai Railway Line (八戸臨海鉄道線, Hachinohe Rinkai Tetsudō-sen) is a Japanese freight-only industrial railway line between Hachinohe Freight Terminal and Kitanuma Station, all within Hachinohe, Aomori.

== History ==
The Hachinohe Rinkai Railway began operations on March 25, 1966, to connect the Port of Hachinohe with a nearby Mitsubishi Paper Mill Ltd. factory. The line was funded and operated by the prefectural government of Aomori Prefecture. On December 1, 1970, in compliance with the Local Railways Law, operations of the line were turned over to the third sector Hachinohe Rinkai Railway (八戸臨海鉄道, Hachinohe Rinkai Tetsudō; "Hachinohe Seaside Railway"). Transport of containers began in 1986.

== Basic data ==
- Distance: 8.5 km (5.3 mi)
- Gauge: 3 ft 6 in (1,067 mm)
- Stations: 2
- Double-tracked section: None
- Electrification: None
- Railway signalling: staff token

== See also ==
- List of railway companies in Japan
- List of railway lines in Japan
