= Hachinohe Thermal Power Station =

Photovoltaic power stations in Japan

Hachinohe Thermal Power Station 八戸火力発電所
- Country: Japan
- Location: Hachinohe, Aomori
- Coordinates: 40°32′4″N 141°30′23″E
- Status: Operational
- Commission date: 2015
- Owner: Tohoku Electric
- Operator: Tohoku Electric Power

Thermal power station
- Primary fuel: LNG

Power generation
- Units operational: 1
- Units decommissioned: 4
- Nameplate capacity: 416 MW

Hachinohe Thermal Power Station (八戸火力発電所, Hachinohe Karyoku Hatsudensho) is a liquefied natural gas (LNG)-fired thermal power station operated by Tohoku Electric in the city of Hachinohe, Aomori, Japan. The facility is located on the Pacific coast.

== History ==
At the time Tohoku Electric was founded, all of its power generation facilities were hydroelectric power plants, mostly concentrated along the Agano River basin in Fukushima Prefecture. As a result, northeastern Japan faced chronic power shortages. As the Hachinohe area was selected as a center for heavy industry by the Japanese government, industrial power consumption was expected to increase, and Tohoku Electric started construction on its first thermal power plant in September 1956. The plant was completed in June 1958. A total of four units were completed. Units 1 and 2 were abolished in 1982 and Unit 4 in 2006, due to aging equipment and a decline in operating rates.

After the 2011 2011 Tōhoku earthquake and tsunami, Unit 5 was rushed into service to make up for a shortfall in electrical generating capacity. Unit 5 was subsequently upgraded to an advanced combined cycle plant by installing an additional waste heat recovery boiler, steam turbine, and generator. At that time, it was also converted from diesel fuel to LNG. The upgraded plant came back on line on August 7, 2014 and its conversion to LNG was completed by July 1, 2015.

On August 7, 2014, the combined cycle of Unit 5 was completed and commercial operation began [4]. Diesel fuel was initially used as fuel, but on November 28, 2012, JX Nippon Oil & Energy signed a supply contract for natural gas, and it was announced that it would be supplied from the company's Hachinohe LNG terminal [5]. The switch to natural gas was implemented on July 1, 2015, and improved power generation capacity and thermal efficiency [6].

Unit 3 was abolished on July 1, 2016 due to aging equipment.

The 1.5 MW Hachinohe Solar Power Plant was built on the site of the scrapped thermal power units and started operation on December 20, 2011

== Plant details ==
Unit	Fuel	Type	Capacity	On line	Status
1	Coal	Steam turbine	75 MW	1958	Decommissioned 1982; Scrapped
2	Coal	Steam turbine	75 MW	1958	Decommissioned 1982; Scrapped
3	Crude Oil, Heavy Oil	Steam turbine	250 MW	1968	Decommissioned 2016; Scrapped
4	Crude Oil, Heavy Oil	Steam turbine	250 MW	1972	Decommissioned 2006; Scrapped
5	LNG	ACC	416 MW	2012	Operational

== See also ==
- Energy in Japan
- List of power stations in Japan
