= Tanesashi Coast =

Coastline of Hachinohe, Japan

Tanesashi Coast 種差海岸
- Coast
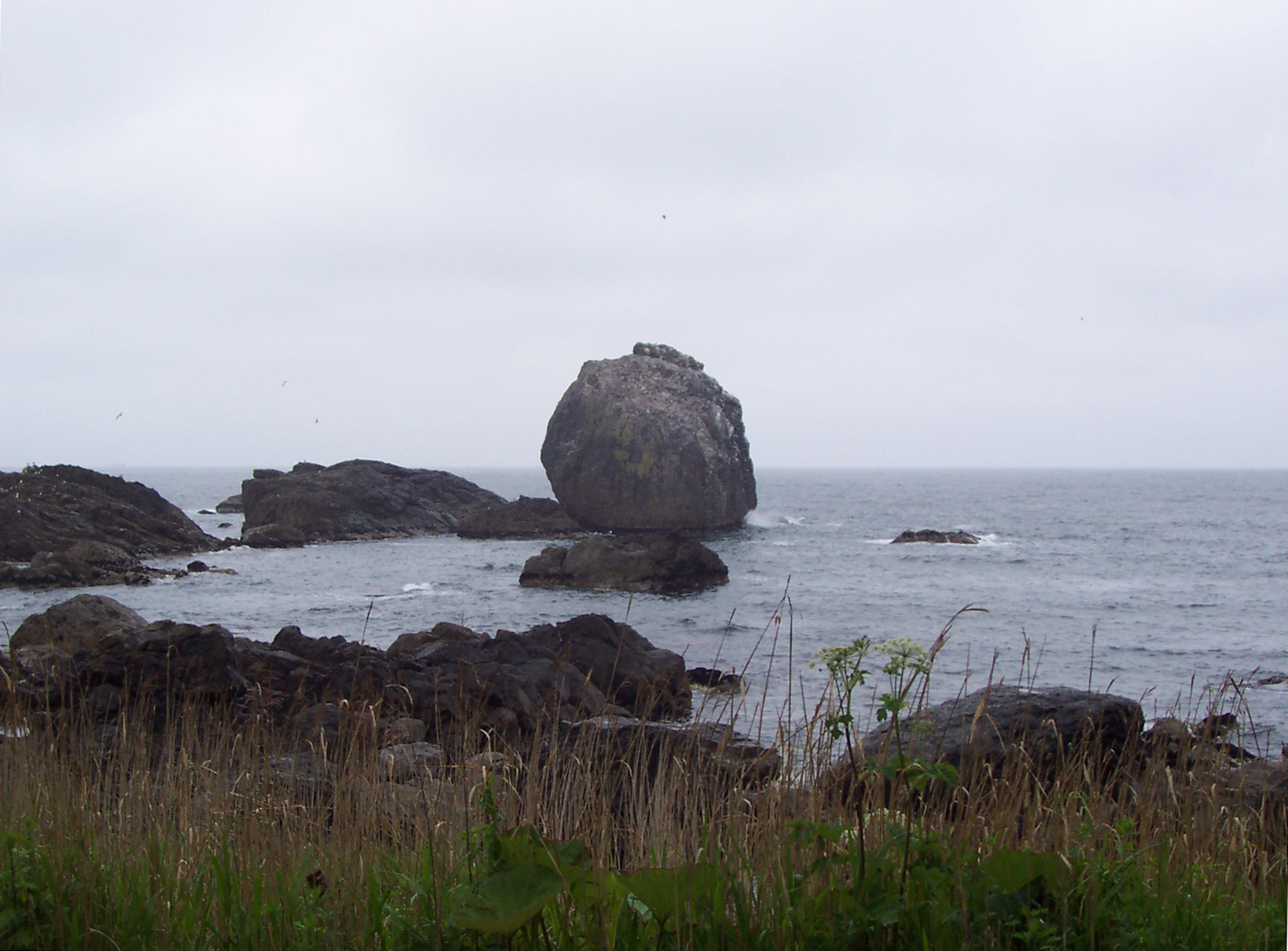
- Tanesashi Coast

- Location within Aomori Prefecture Location within Japan
- Coordinates: 40°31′2.3″N 141°36′6.2″E
- Location: Hachinohe, Aomori, Japan

Dimensions
  - Length: 12 km (7.5 mi)
- National Palace of Scenic Beauty

The Tanesashi Coast (種差海岸, Tanesashi kaigan) is section of the coastline on the Pacific Ocean, located in the southern portion of the city of Hachinohe, Aomori Prefecture, in the Tōhoku region of northern Japan. It is extends for 12 kilometres (7.5 mi) from the island of Kabushima south towards the city of Kuji in Iwate Prefecture. The coast was nationally designated a Place of Scenic Beauty in 1937.

== Overview ==
The coastline includes both sandy and rocky beaches, but is for the most part an elevated coastal terrace noted for its grassy meadows and scenic views.

The area was included within the borders of the Tanesashi Kaigan Hashikamidake Prefectural Natural Park established in 1953. In 2013 the park was incorporated into Sanriku Fukkō National Park.

Samekado Lighthouse, listed as one of the “50 Lighthouses of Japan” by the Japan Lighthouse Association is located on the Tanesashi Coast.

== Gallery ==
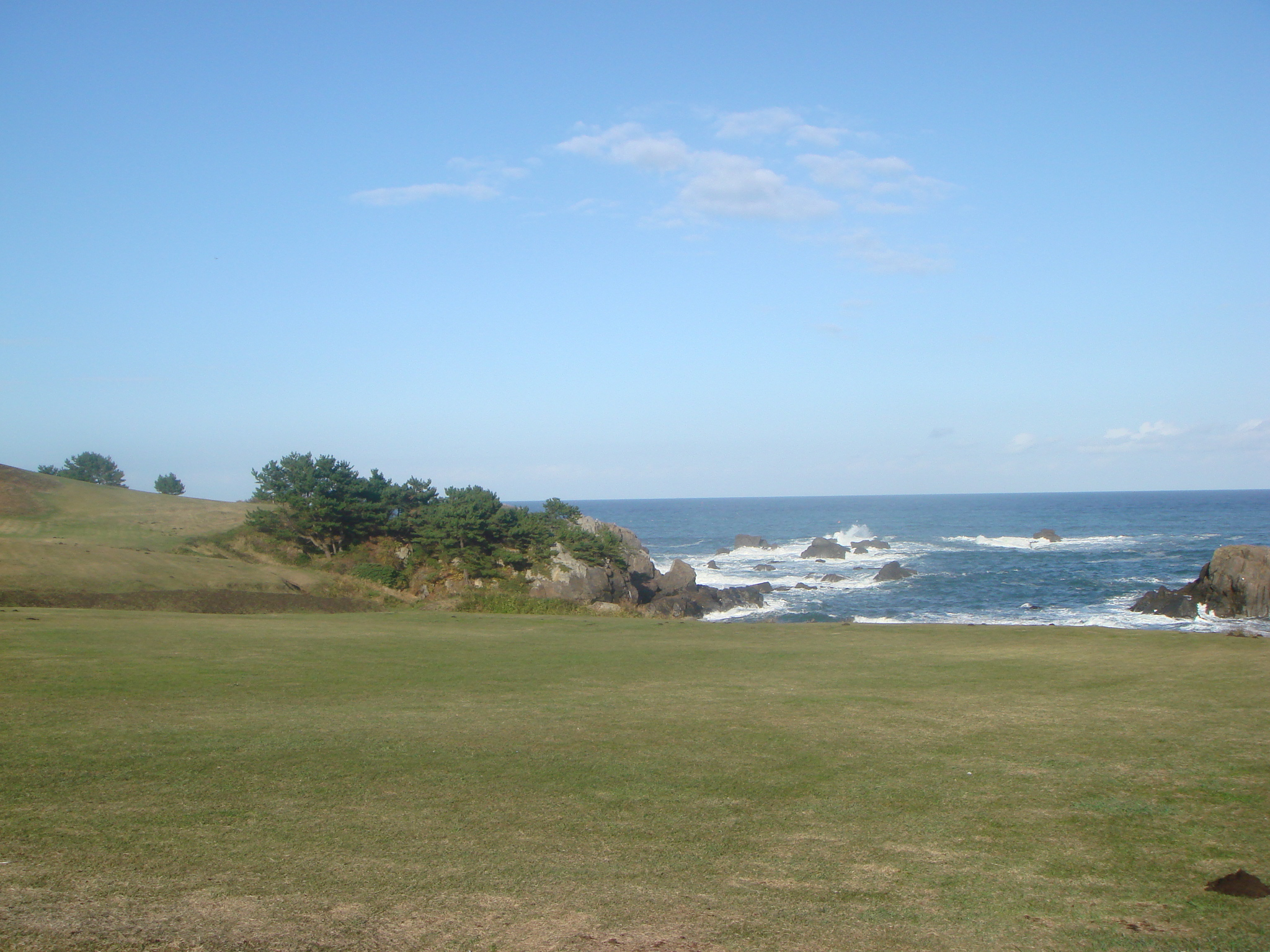
Grassy meadows on the Tanesashi Coast

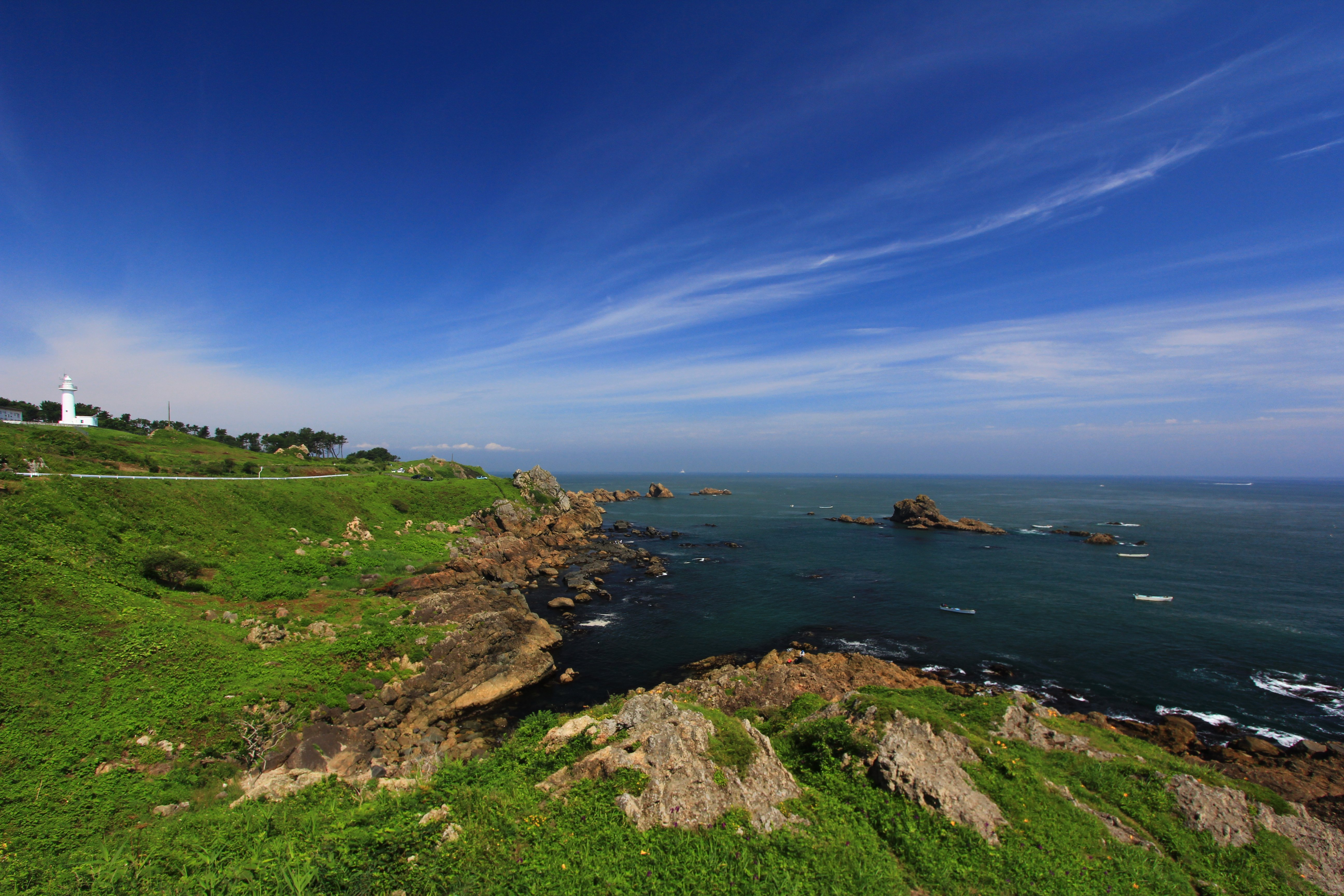
Rocky beaches

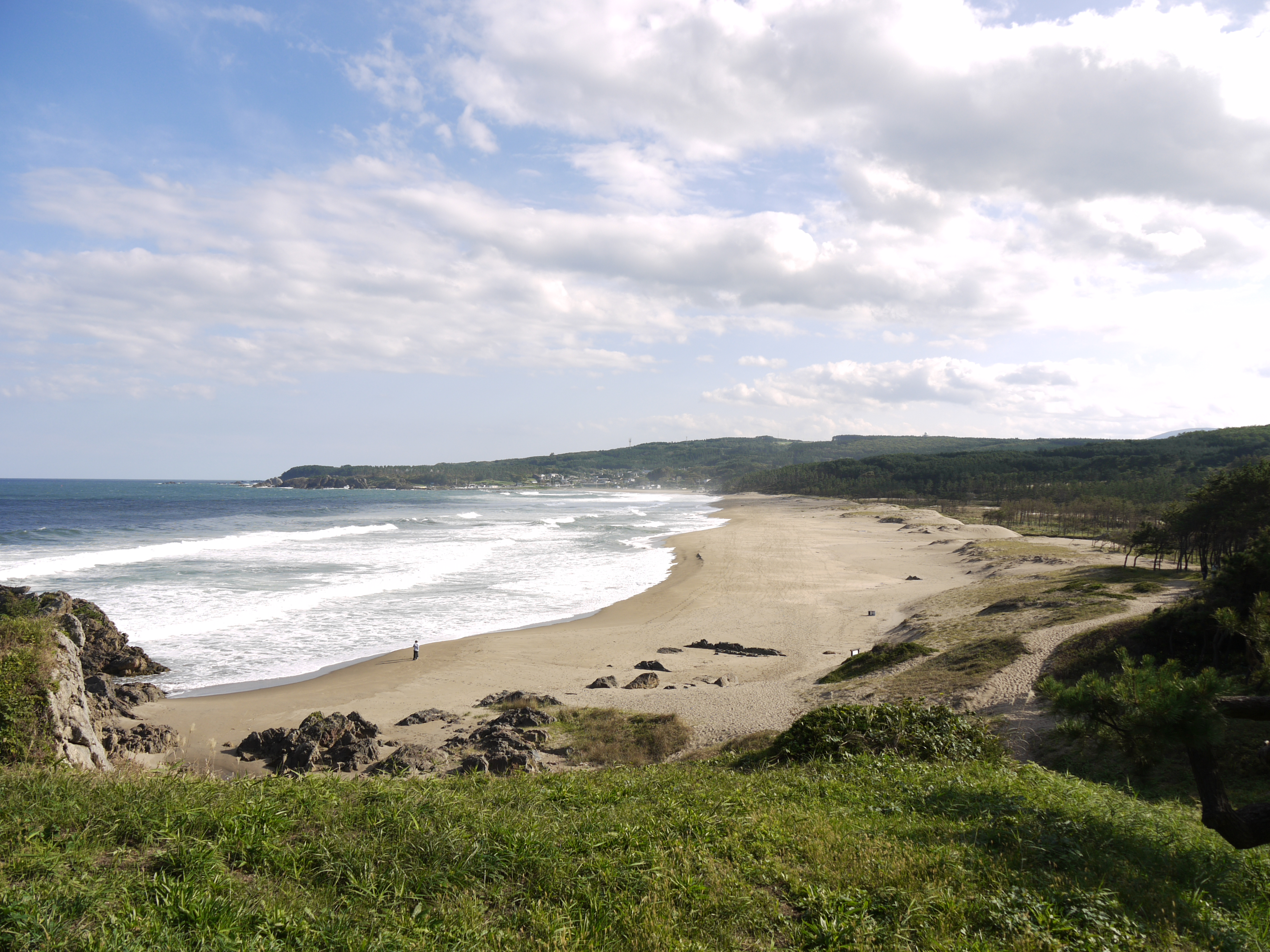
Osuga beach

== See also ==
- List of Places of Scenic Beauty of Japan (Aomori)
- Tanesashi-Kaigan Station
