= Hachinohe Castle =

Former Japanese castle

Hachinohe Castle 八戸城
- Hachinohe, Aomori Prefecture, Japan
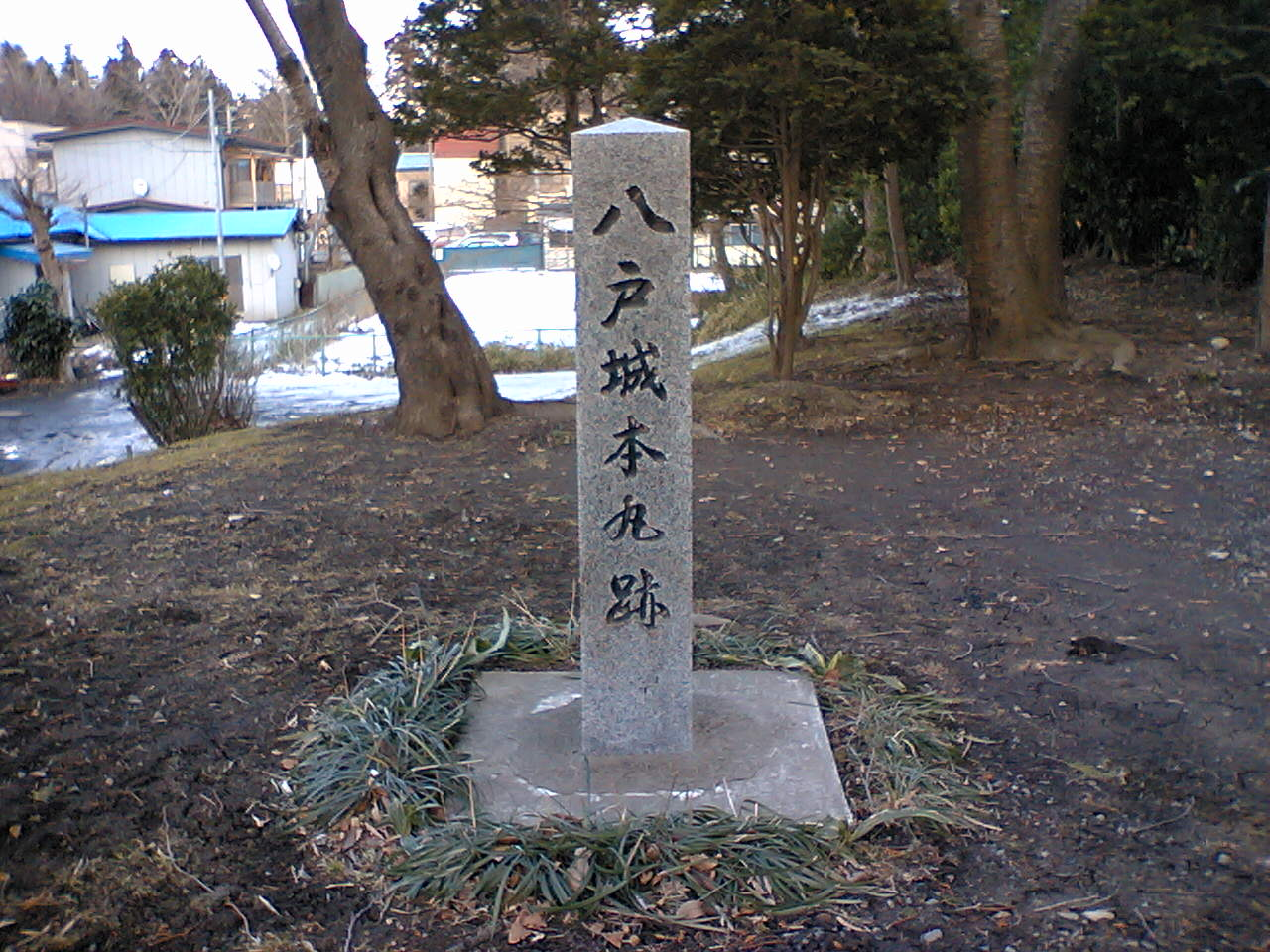
- site of Hachinohe Castle central bailey

Site information
- Type: Hirayama-style Japanese castle
- Open to the public: yes
- Condition: ruins

Location
- Hachinohe Castle
- Location within Aomori Prefecture Location within Japan
- Coordinates: 40°30′53.1″N 141°29′16.3″E

Site history
- Built: 1627
- In use: Edo period
- Demolished: 1871

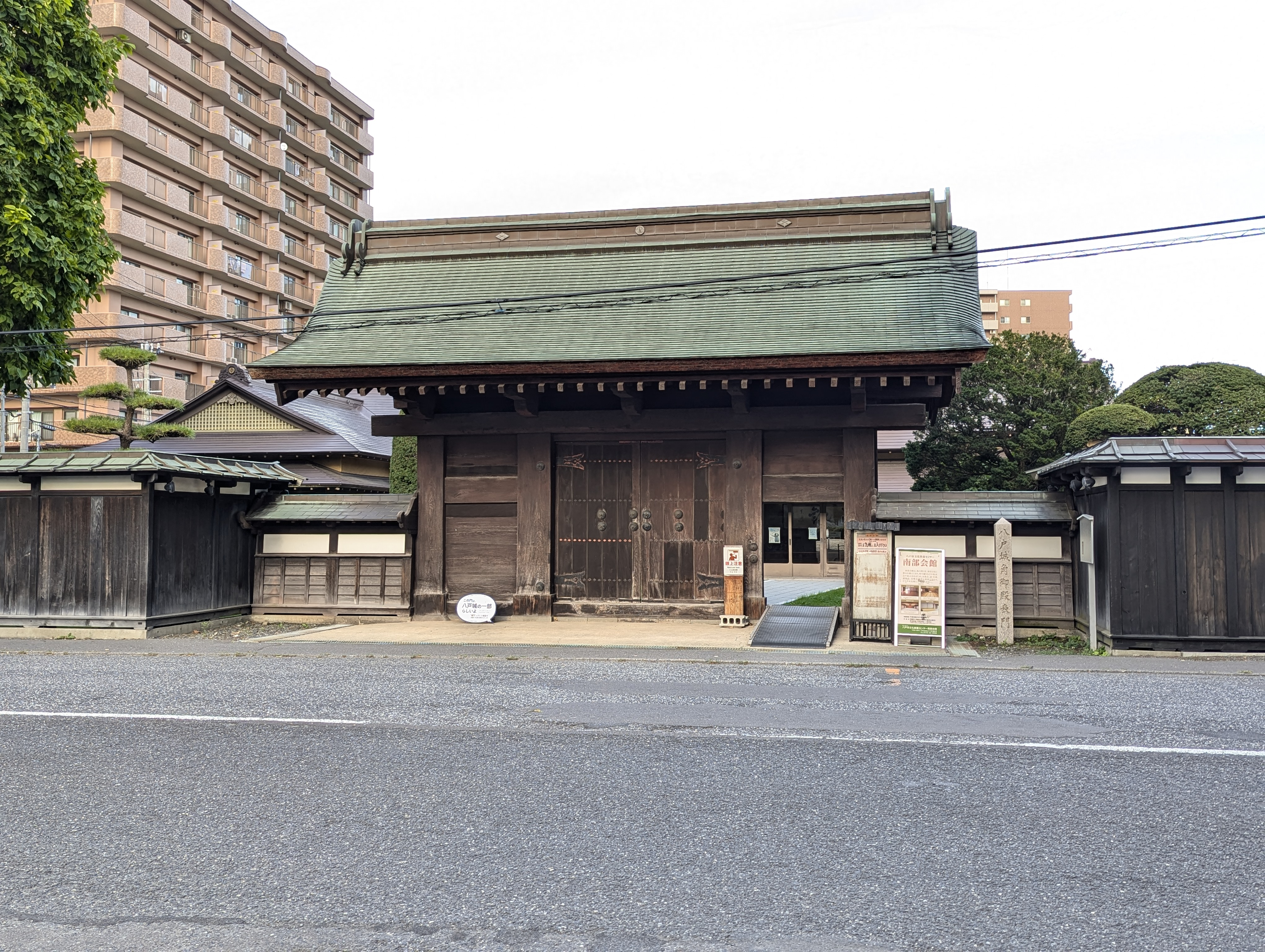
Gate of Hachinohe Castle

Hachinohe Castle (八戸城, Hachinohe-jō) was a Japanese castle that formed the administrative center of Hachinohe Domain, a feudal domain of the Nambu clan, located in the center of what is now the city of Hachinohe in Aomori Prefecture, Japan. Nothing remains of the castle today.

== History ==
Hachinohe Castle was constructed in 1627, but styled as a jin'ya due to restrictions set by the Tokugawa Shogunate, which permitted only one castle per domain. It had two sets of concentric moats, and a two-story central structure with a barracks but no donjon. It became the headquarters of the new Hachinohe Domain in 1664. From 1827 to 1829, the eighth daimyō, Nambu Nobumasa, constructed a new palace in the inner bailey, as well as a martial arts training school in the second bailey. In 1838, Hachinohe Domain was upgraded in rank by the Shogunate, and for the first time Hachinohe Castle was officially styled as a “castle”.

After the Meiji Restoration, the new Meiji government ordered the destruction of all former feudal fortifications, and in compliance with this directive, all structures of Hachinohe Castle were pulled down in 1871, with the Miyagi Jinja (三八城神社) Shinto shrine erected in the main bailey in its place. The site is now an urban park, Miyagi Park, and nothing remains of the former castle aside from a monument and local place-names.

One gate from the palace, built in 1797, has survived as a gate to the private residence of the descendants of Hachinohe Nambu clan, who received the title of viscount under the kazoku peerage system in the Meiji period. This Sumigoten Omote Gate (角御殿表門) is an Aomori Prefecture Important Cultural Property.

== Literature ==
- De Lange, William (2021). An Encyclopedia of Japanese Castles. Groningen: Toyo Press. pp. 600 pages. ISBN 978-9492722300.
- Schmorleitz, Morton S. (1974). Castles in Japan. Tokyo: Charles E. Tuttle Co. pp. 144–145. ISBN 0-8048-1102-4.
- Motoo, Hinago (1986). Japanese Castles. Tokyo: Kodansha. p. 200 pages. ISBN 0-87011-766-1.
- Mitchelhill, Jennifer (2004). Castles of the Samurai: Power and Beauty. Tokyo: Kodansha. p. 112 pages. ISBN 4-7700-2954-3.
- Turnbull, Stephen (2003). Japanese Castles 1540-1640. Osprey Publishing. p. 64 pages. ISBN 1-84176-429-9.
