= Hachinohe =

Hachinohe 八戸市
- Core city
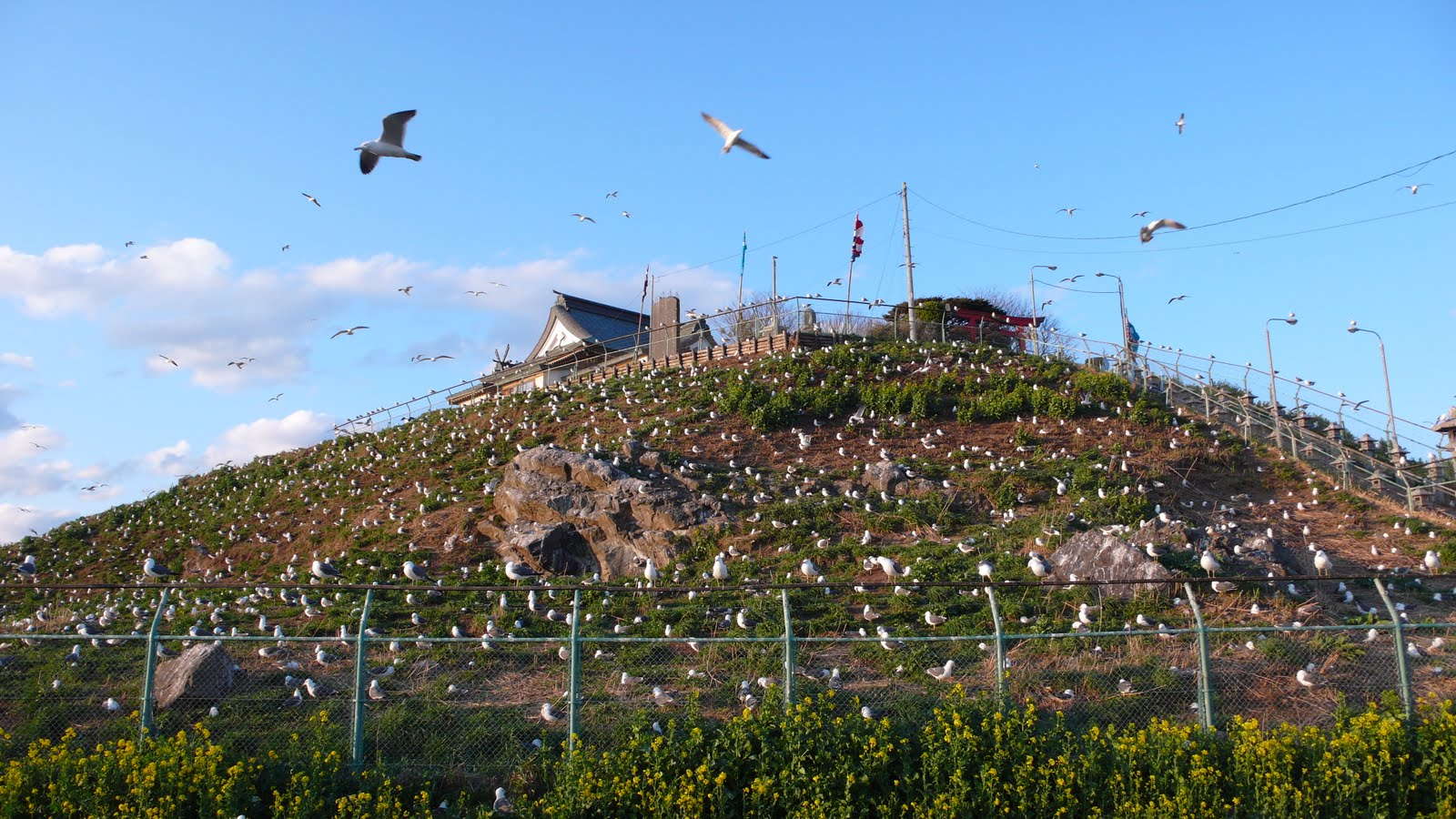

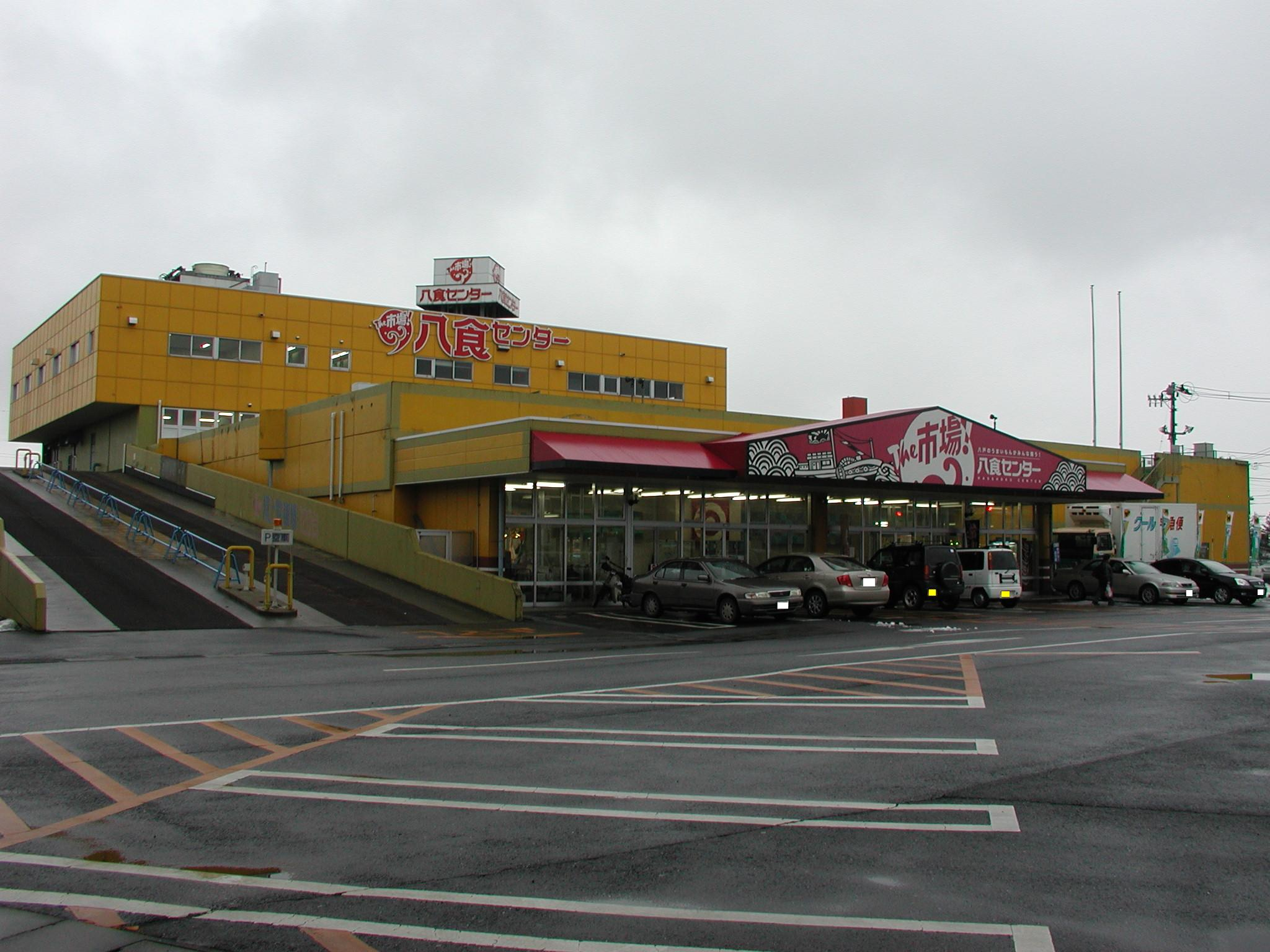

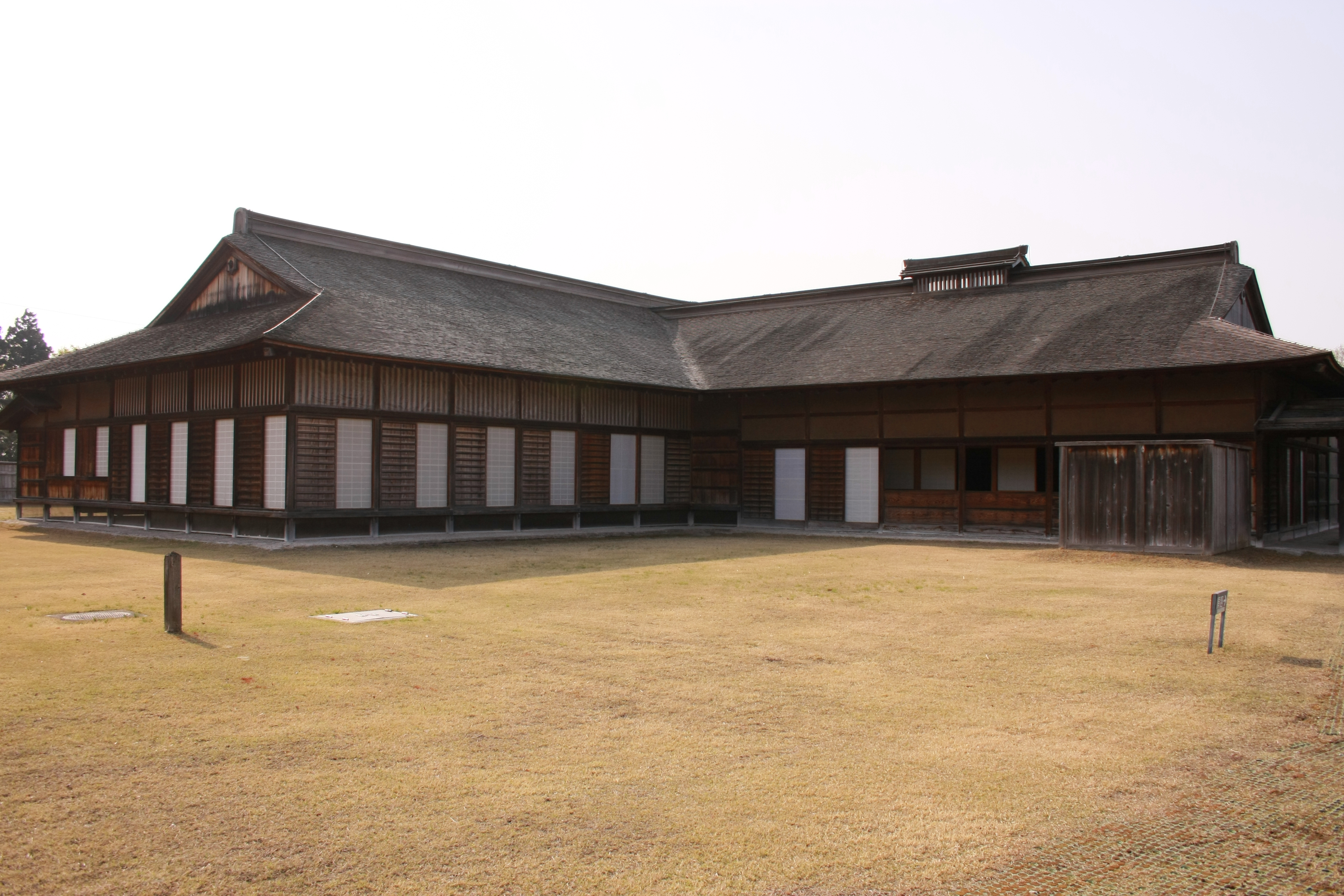

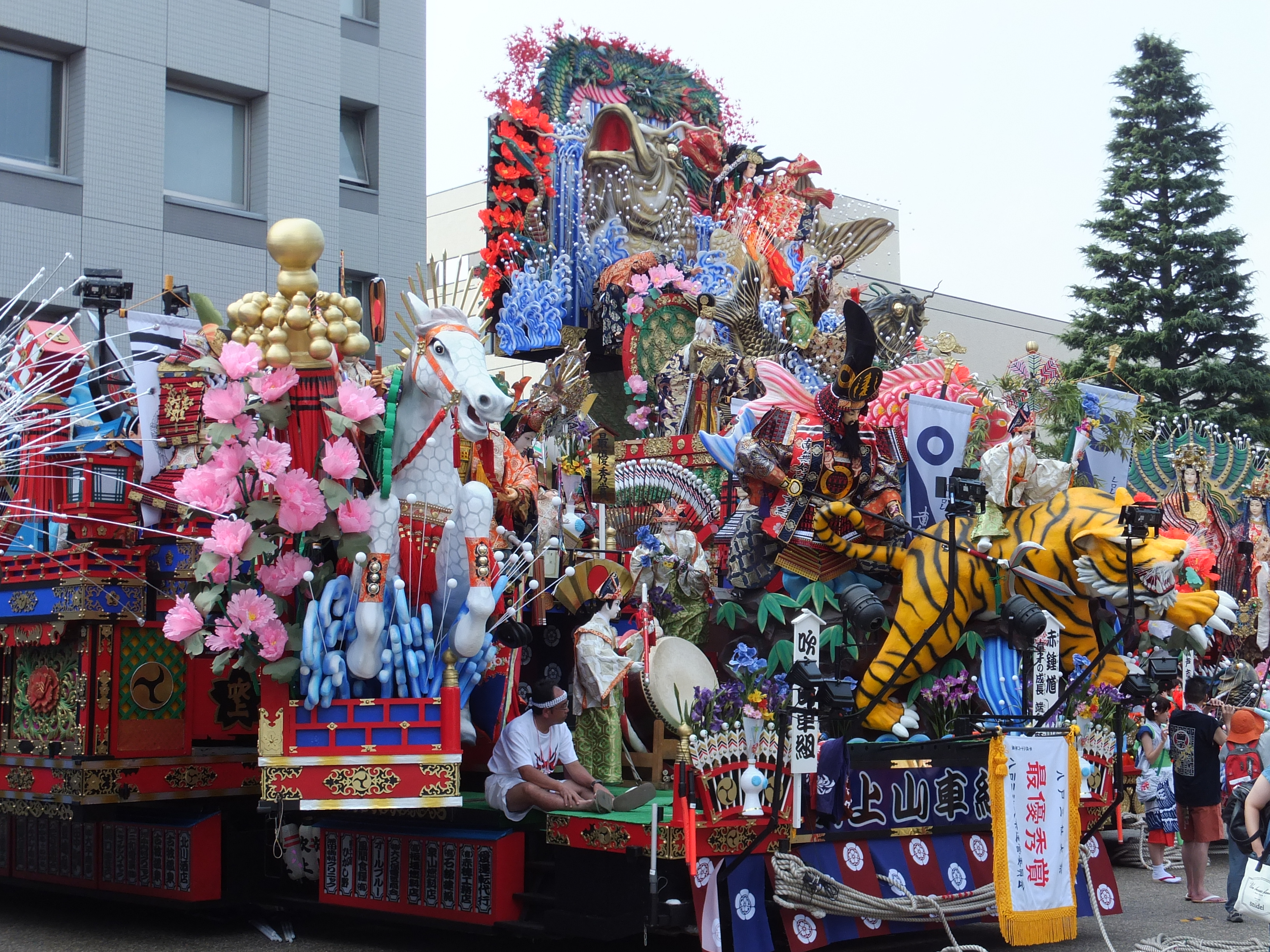

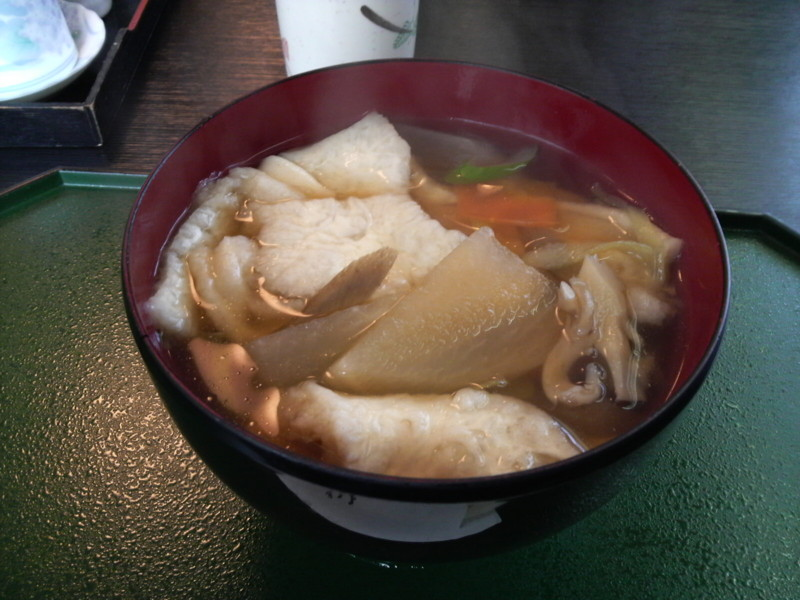
Kabushima
Hasshoku Center	Ne Castle
Hachinohe Sansha Taisai	Senbeijiru
- Flag Seal
- Interactive map of Hachinohe
- Coordinates: 40°30′44″N 141°29′18″E
- Country: Japan
- Region: Tōhoku
- Prefecture: Aomori

Government
  - Mayor: Yuichi Kumagai

Area
  - Total: 305.56 km^{2} (117.98 sq mi)

Population (December 31, 2025)
  - Total: 212,279
  - Density: 694.72/km^{2} (1,799.3/sq mi)
- Time zone: UTC+9 (Japan Standard Time)
- Phone number: 0178-43-2111
- Address: 1-1-1 Uchimaru, Hachinohe-shi, Aomori-ken 031-8686
- Climate: Cfa/Dfa
- Website: Official website
- Symbols
- Bird: Black-tailed gull
- Flower: Chrysanthemum
- Tree: Japanese yew

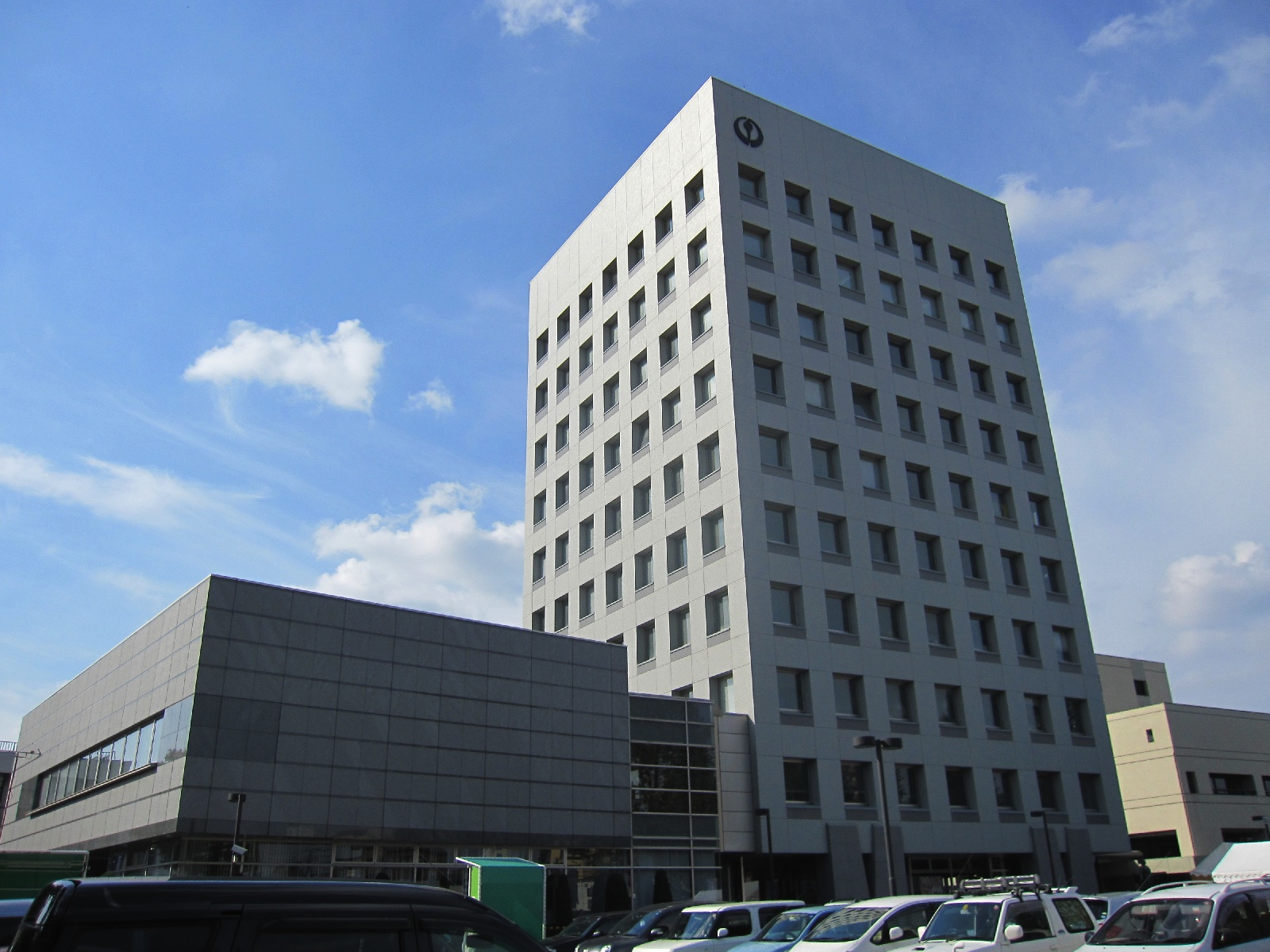
Hachinohe City Hall

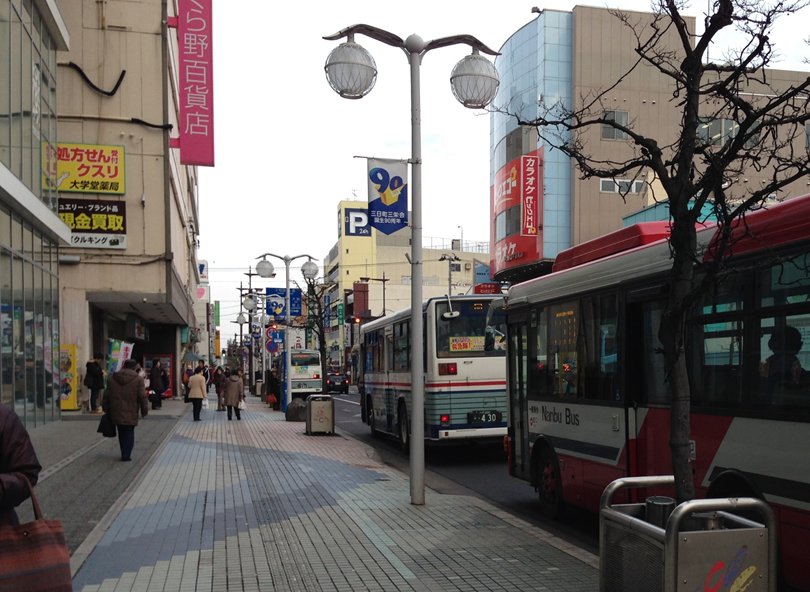
Downtown Hachinohe

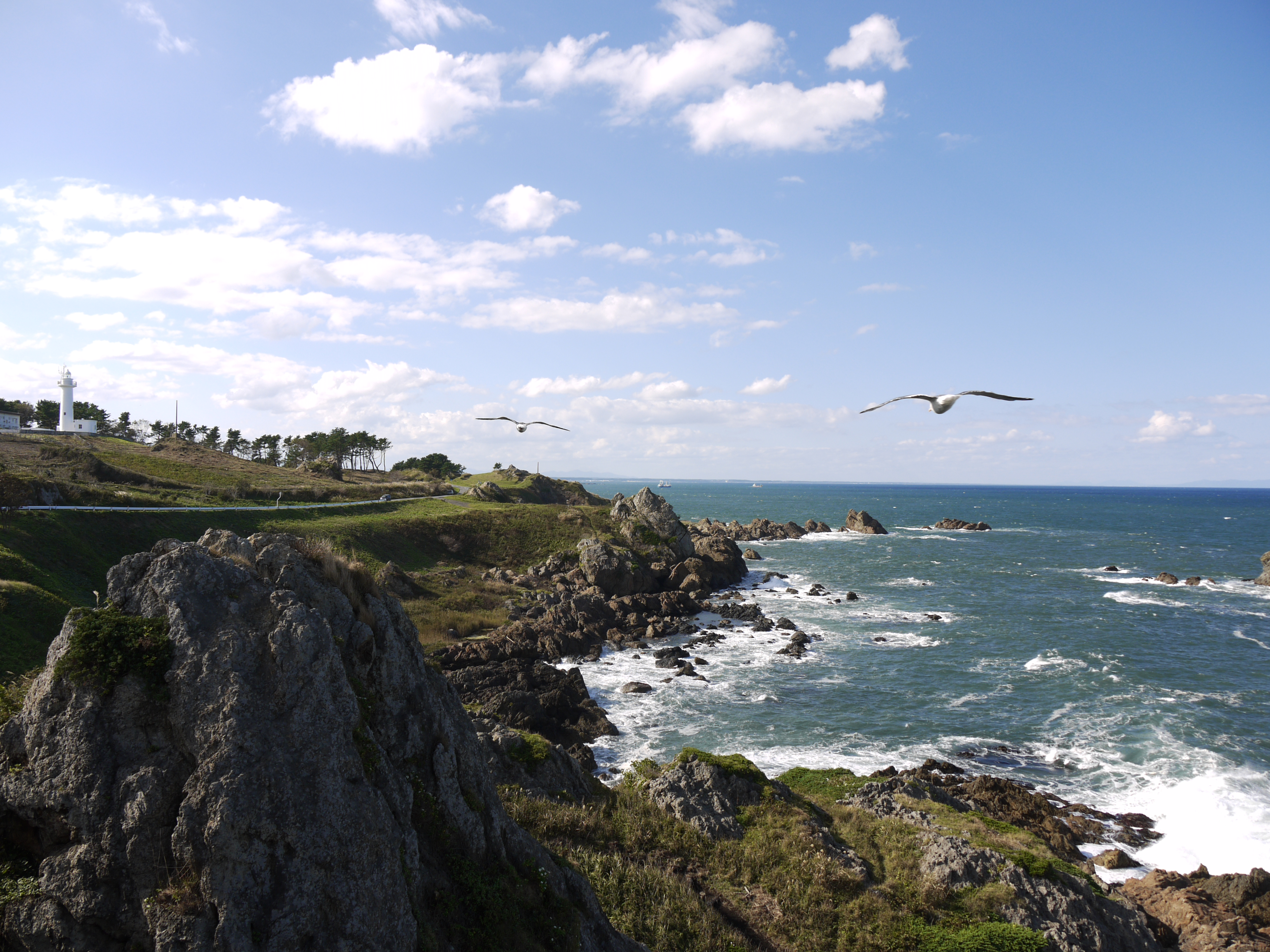
Tanesashi Beach

Hachinohe (八戸市, Hachinohe-shi) is a city located in Aomori Prefecture, Japan. As of 31 December 2025, the city had an estimated population of 212,279 in 109,987 households, and a population density of 695 inhabitants per square kilometre (1,800/sq mi). As of October 2020, Hachinohe is Aomori Prefecture's second largest city by population. The city has a total area of 305.56 square kilometres (117.98 sq mi).

== Geography ==
Hachinohe is located in the flatlands on the southeast coast of Aomori Prefecture, facing the Pacific Ocean. Both the Oirase River and the Mabechi River flow through Hachinohe. A portion of the coastal areas of the city were within the borders of the Tanesashi Kaigan Hashikamidake Prefectural Natural Park, which was incorporated into the Sanriku Fukkō National Park in 2013.

=== Neighbouring municipalities ===
- Iwate Prefecture
  - Karumai

Aomori Prefecture

- Kamikita District
  - Oirase
- Sannohe District
  - Gonohe
  - Hashikami
  - Nanbu

== Climate ==
Hachinohe has a humid continental climate (Köppen Dfa), closely bordering the Humid Subtropical climate (Köppen Cfa) using the 0.0 °C (32.0 °F) isotherm with both January and February monthly averages being too cold to be of the latter, with hot summers and cold and snowy winters. Summers are considerably milder than in other parts of Honshu because the city is very close to the open sea, while winters if distinctly cold are much less snowy than in Aomori city or Sapporo or Wakkanai, although snowfall is higher than in Kushiro. The average annual temperature in Hachinohe is 9.9 °C (49.8 °F). The average annual rainfall is 1,165 mm (45.9 in) with September as the wettest month. The temperatures are highest on average in August, at around 22.7 °C (72.9 °F), and lowest in January, at around −1.9 °C (28.6 °F).

Climate data for Hachinohe (elevation 27.1 m, 1991–2020 normals, extremes 1936–present)
Month	Jan	Feb	Mar	Apr	May	Jun	Jul	Aug	Sep	Oct	Nov	Dec	Year
Record high °C (°F)	15.0 (59.0)	19.0 (66.2)	23.5 (74.3)	29.7 (85.5)	34.3 (93.7)	34.5 (94.1)	36.5 (97.7)	37.0 (98.6)	35.4 (95.7)	30.4 (86.7)	24.9 (76.8)	19.7 (67.5)	37.0 (98.6)
Mean maximum °C (°F)	8.7 (47.7)	11.7 (53.1)	17.1 (62.8)	23.7 (74.7)	28.1 (82.6)	29.3 (84.7)	32.7 (90.9)	33.8 (92.8)	31.0 (87.8)	24.3 (75.7)	20.0 (68.0)	12.8 (55.0)	34.5 (94.1)
Mean daily maximum °C (°F)	2.8 (37.0)	3.6 (38.5)	7.6 (45.7)	13.8 (56.8)	18.7 (65.7)	21.1 (70.0)	24.9 (76.8)	26.5 (79.7)	23.6 (74.5)	18.2 (64.8)	11.9 (53.4)	5.4 (41.7)	14.9 (58.8)
Daily mean °C (°F)	−0.7 (30.7)	−0.2 (31.6)	3.1 (37.6)	8.6 (47.5)	13.5 (56.3)	16.7 (62.1)	20.7 (69.3)	22.6 (72.7)	19.4 (66.9)	13.5 (56.3)	7.3 (45.1)	1.7 (35.1)	10.5 (50.9)
Mean daily minimum °C (°F)	−3.9 (25.0)	−3.7 (25.3)	−0.9 (30.4)	4.0 (39.2)	9.2 (48.6)	13.3 (55.9)	17.7 (63.9)	19.5 (67.1)	15.7 (60.3)	9.0 (48.2)	3.0 (37.4)	−1.6 (29.1)	6.8 (44.2)
Mean minimum °C (°F)	−8.3 (17.1)	−8.3 (17.1)	−5.8 (21.6)	−1.5 (29.3)	3.2 (37.8)	8.8 (47.8)	13.2 (55.8)	14.2 (57.6)	9.3 (48.7)	2.9 (37.2)	−2.3 (27.9)	−5.6 (21.9)	−9.1 (15.6)
Record low °C (°F)	−15.7 (3.7)	−15.5 (4.1)	−12.3 (9.9)	−5.5 (22.1)	−2.6 (27.3)	0.4 (32.7)	5.0 (41.0)	9.4 (48.9)	4.8 (40.6)	−2.6 (27.3)	−6.3 (20.7)	−13.4 (7.9)	−15.7 (3.7)
Average precipitation mm (inches)	43.6 (1.72)	40.4 (1.59)	56.6 (2.23)	63.4 (2.50)	88.1 (3.47)	103.7 (4.08)	136.9 (5.39)	141.8 (5.58)	156.3 (6.15)	110.1 (4.33)	55.5 (2.19)	48.9 (1.93)	1,045.1 (41.15)
Average snowfall cm (inches)	40 (16)	42 (17)	29 (11)	2 (0.8)	0 (0)	0 (0)	0 (0)	0 (0)	0 (0)	0 (0)	2 (0.8)	22 (8.7)	134 (53)
Average precipitation days (≥ 0.5 mm)	8.8	8.3	9.3	9.7	11.2	10.1	12.1	11.9	11.4	10.1	9.8	8.4	121.1
Average snowy days	10.4	9.9	5.9	0.5	0.0	0.0	0.0	0.0	0.0	0.0	0.7	6.1	33.3
Average relative humidity (%)	71	70	66	65	72	81	84	82	80	75	71	71	74
Mean monthly sunshine hours	126.1	130.9	166.2	186.9	198.5	168.2	149.7	159.5	148.2	155.7	130.3	124.1	1,844.3
Source: Japan Meteorological Agency (1991–2020 normals, extremes 1936–present)

== Demographics ==
Per Japanese census data:

Historical population
Year	Pop.	±%
1960	184,680	—
1970	216,955	+17.5%
1980	245,617	+13.2%
1990	247,983	+1.0%
2000	248,608	+0.3%
2010	237,473	−4.5%
2020	226,541	−4.6%

== History ==
The area around Hachinohe has been occupied since prehistoric times, and was a major population center for the Emishi people. Numerous Jōmon period remains have been discovered within the borders of Hachinohe. The area was nominally under control of the Northern Fujiwara in the Heian period, and became part of the holdings granted to the Nanbu clan after the defeat of the North Fujiwara by Minamoto no Yoritomo in the Kamakura period. The Nanbu established numerous horse ranches, accompanied by numbered fortified settlements. During the Edo period, it was initially part of Morioka Domain, but in 1664 the Tokugawa shogunate authorized the creation of a separate 20,000 koku Hachinohe Domain for a junior line of the Nanbu clan. The town prospered as a castle town centered on Hachinohe Castle, and served as a small commercial centre and port for the fishing grounds off southeastern Hokkaido. Today, the port still serves the fishing industry and a number of international cargo vessels.

After the Meiji Restoration, Hachinohe Domain was abolished, and replaced by Hachinohe Prefecture, which was subsequently merged into Aomori Prefecture. Initially, there was a debate as to whether the capital of newly formed Aomori Prefecture should be at Hachinohe or Hirosaki; however, due to strong rivalry between the former Nanbu domain and former Tsugaru Domain, the Meiji government decided to build a new town called Aomori in a central location, and to designate it as the capital of the prefecture.

Per the Meiji period establishment of the modern municipalities system on April 1, 1889, the town of Hachinohe was created within Sannohe District. In 1901, it merged with neighboring Chōja, and on May 1, 1929, with neighboring Konakano, Minato and Same villages to form the city of Hachinohe. The city further expanded by annexing the village of Shimonaganawashiro in 1942, Korekawa in 1954, Ichikawa, Kaminaganawashiro, Tachi and Toyosaki in 1955 and Odate in 1958.

On March 31, 2005, the village of Nangō (from Sannohe District) was also merged into Hachinohe.

During the American occupation of Japan following World War II, a United States Army base, Camp Haugen, was located in Hachinohe, and was the home of the Seventh Division. An Armed Forces Radio Service radio station was located on the base; it was known as AFRS Hachinohe. In 1950, after the North Korean invasion of South Korea, troops from Camp Haugen left for Korea. AFRS Hachinohe altered its broadcasts to include coverage of South Korea so Americans could benefit from its news and entertainment programs. With the final withdrawal of American forces from Hachinohe in 1956, the base was turned over to the Japan Ground Self-Defense Force and was officially re-designated JGSDF Camp Hachinohe.

In March 2011, the city was one of those hit by the 2011 Japanese tsunami. The tsunami tossed many huge fishing boats ashore and heavily damaged the port area. About 100 homes were destroyed. Divers from the United States Navy ship Safeguard joined with Japanese workers to help clear the port to facilitate the delivery of relief supplies via the city.

On January 1, 2017, Hachinohe was given core city status, with increased local autonomy.

On December 8, 2025, Hachinohe was struck by the 7.6 M_{w} 2025 Sanriku earthquake and experienced a maximum intensity of upper 6 on the Shindo scale.

== Government ==
Hachinohe has a mayor-council form of government with a directly elected mayor and a unicameral city legislature of 32 members. Hachinohe contributes eight members to the Aomori Prefectural Assembly. In terms of national politics, the town is part of Aomori 2nd district of the lower house of the Diet of Japan.

== Economy ==
Hachinohe is the largest city in eastern Aomori Prefecture, and serves as the regional industrial and commercial center. Commercial fishing still plays a major role in the local economy, with Hachinohe port having one of the largest volumes of landed fish in Japan. However, since its designation as a new industrial city in 1964, Hachinohe has developed a large coastal industrial belt with a diverse range of chemical, steel, cement and fertilizer products. Major industrial parks include the Hachinohe High Tech Park and Hachinohe North-Interchange Industrial Complex. The Hachinohe Thermal Power Station, an LNG-fired power plant operated by Tohoku Electric is located in the city. Hachinohe Port is a major international port for northern Japan.

== Education ==
=== Colleges and universities ===
- Hachinohe Gakuin Junior College
- Hachinohe Gakuin University
- Hachinohe Institute of Technology

=== Primary and secondary education ===
Hachinohe has 42 public elementary schools and 24 public junior high schools operated by the city government, and two private middle schools. The city has eight public high schools operated by the Aomori Prefectural Board of Education, and one public high school operated by the national government. There are also eight private high schools. The city also has three special education schools.

== Transportation ==
=== Railway ===
East Japan Railway Company (JR East) - Tōhoku Shinkansen

- Hachinohe

East Japan Railway Company (JR East) - Hachinohe Line

- Hachinohe - Naganawashiro - Hon-Hachinohe - Konakano, Mutsu-Minato - Shirogane - Same - Mutsu-Shirahama - Tanesashi-Kaigan - Ōkuki - Kanehama

Aoimori Railway Company - Aoimori Railway Line

- Kita-Takaiwa - Hachinohe - Mutsu-Ichikawa

Hachinohe Rinkai Railway (freight only)

=== Highway ===
- Hachinohe Expressway
- Momoishi Toll Road
- Hachinohe-Kuji Expressway
- National Route 45
- National Route 104
- National Route 340
- National Route 454

=== Seaports ===
- Port of Hachinohe

=== Air ===
The nearest commercial airport is served by Misawa Airport which is located approximately 26 km (16 mi) north of Hachinohe. JMSDF Hachinohe Air Base is based the city which is a military aerodrome of the Japan Maritime Self-Defense Force (JMSDF). It is located 5.6 km (3 mi) northwest of Hachinohe.

== Local attractions ==
=== Traditional handicrafts ===
- The Hachinohe horse (八幡馬, Yawata-uma), a wooden horse with gold saddle markings and a decorative plume attached to its head. The Hachinohe area has been known since the Kamakura period for its breed of war horses. Also, farming horses have supported the lives of the commoners and have often been used as the theme for dances and folk tales. The art of Yawata-uma figurines is a regional art form and popular souvenir.

=== Local sights ===
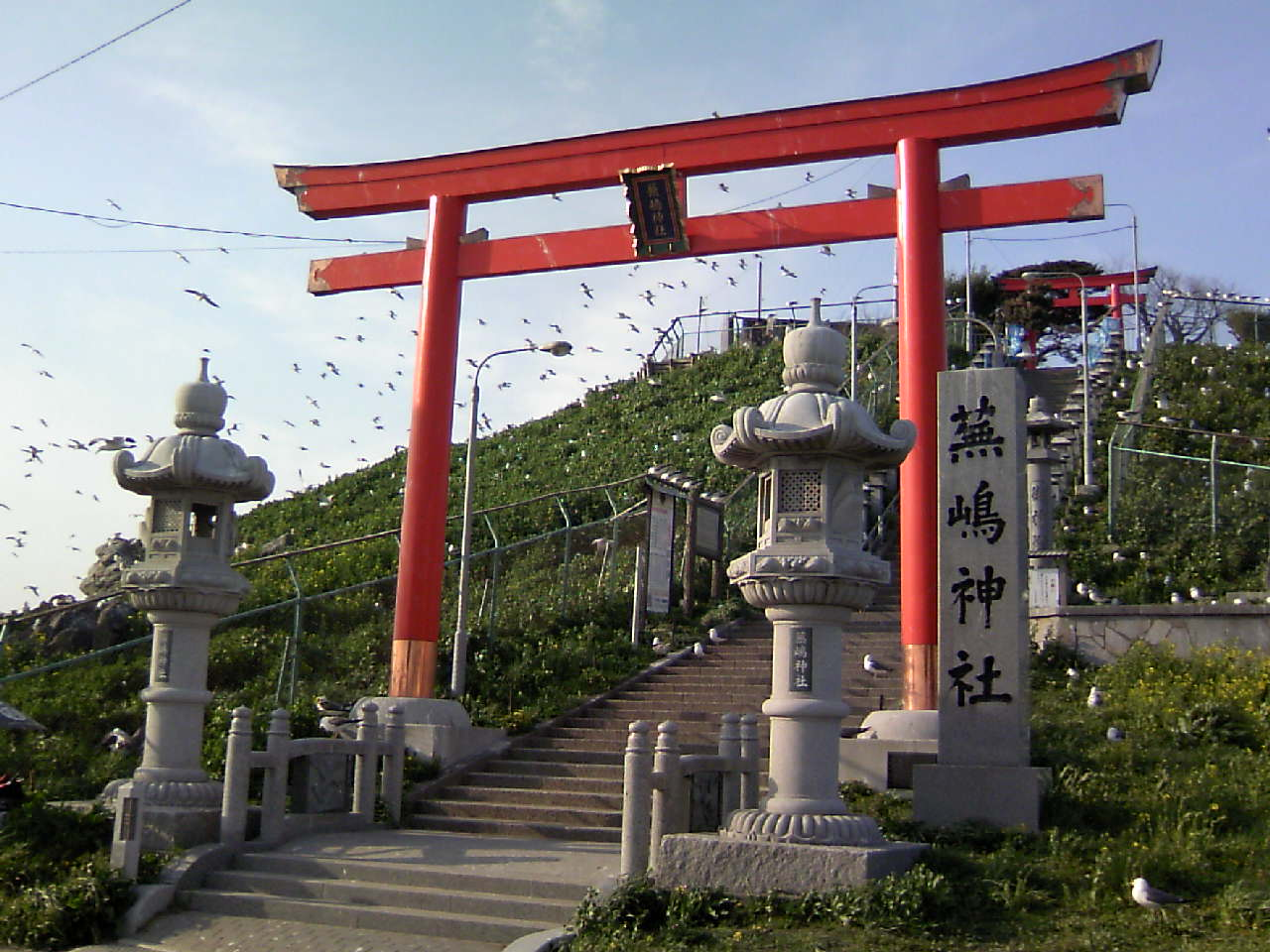
Entrance to Kabushima Shrine, with Umineko

- Kabushima is an island offshore Hachinohe which also serves as a habitat for forty thousand black-tailed gulls, or umineko. It is a national Natural Monument. It also has a Shinto shrine.
- Kushihiki Hachimangū
- Tanesashi Coast a nationally designated Place of Scenic Beauty.
- Yomasari Dam

=== Local festivals ===
- Emburi is a citywide festival which is also celebrated in nearby towns. The objective of the festival is to pray for a bountiful harvest in the coming year. It originated as a dance with an agricultural tool (the eburi; enburi is a local pronunciation), which was used to teach people how to cultivate the land. Nowadays it is a parade of 15-20 people, with 3-5 dancers and a singer accompanied by wooden flutes, drums and bells. The festival takes place February 17–20, and marks the official end of the long, harsh winter.
- Hachinohe Sansha Taisai is another citywide festival and is considered to be the main festival of the town. It is also billed as "Japan's Biggest Float Festival". Sansha means 'three shrines' and taisai means 'festival': It is held by three Shinto shrines: Ogami Jinja, Shinra Jinja, and Shinmei-gu. Floats proceed through the main streets of the city, accompanied by people with drums, flutes and loud calls. 27 different floats are built and displayed by the members of various organizations, such as schools and the city hall. The floats are also accompanied by men in samurai costumes on horseback, and tiger dancers. On the second and third days of the festival, a traditional game of a sport similar to polo is held at the stables of Shinra Shrine. This sport (加賀美流騎馬打毬, Kaga Biryū Kiba Dakyū) is officially an "intangible cultural asset" of Aomori Prefecture. Sansha Taisai takes place from July 31 to August 4 every year.

=== National Historic Sites ===
- Chōshichiyachi Shell Mound, Jōmon period ruins
- Korekawa Site, Jōmon period ruins
- Ne Castle, Muromachi period castle ruins
- Tangotai Kofun cluster, Kofun period tumuli

=== Other ===
- The sound of the umi-neko at Hachinohe was selected by the Ministry of the Environment as one of the 100 Soundscapes of Japan.

== Sports ==
- Tohoku Free Blades, Asia League Ice Hockey team
- Vanraure Hachinohe, J-League soccer team

== Sister cities ==
- Federal Way, Washington, United States
- Lanzhou, Gansu, China since April 1998

== Notable people from Hachinohe ==
- Saeko Chiba, voice actress
- Miki Furukawa, musician, and former bass guitarist and singer for the Japanese rock band Supercar
- Kengo Hanazawa, manga artist
- Junichi Kanda, polictician
- Chiharu Icho, freestyle wrestler
- Kaori Icho, freestyle wrestler
- Masako Katsuki, voice actress
- Hitomi Obara, freestyle wrestler
- Tadamori Oshima, politician
- Marimo Ragawa, manga artist
- Melody Sekikawa, competition climber

== Other ==
There is a main-belt asteroid named Hachinohe.
