= Sanriku Fukkō National Park =

National Park in Tōhoku, Japan

- 三陸復興国立公園
- IUCN category II (national park)
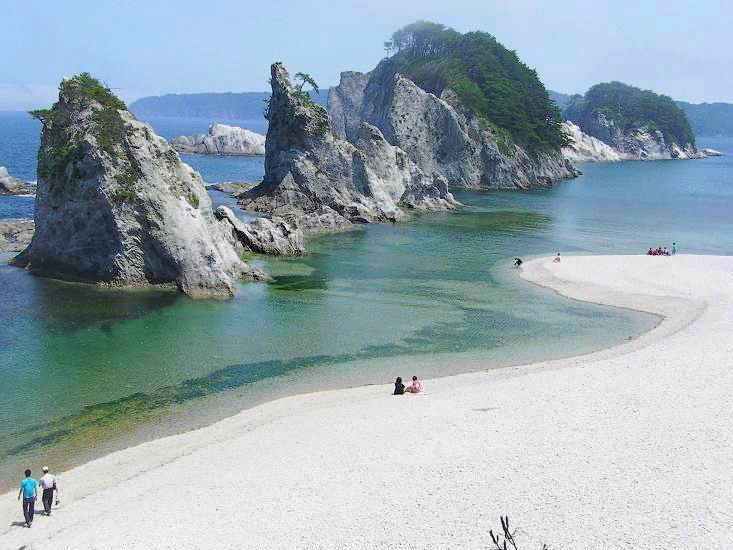
- Jōdogahama in 2007 (Place of Scenic Beauty)

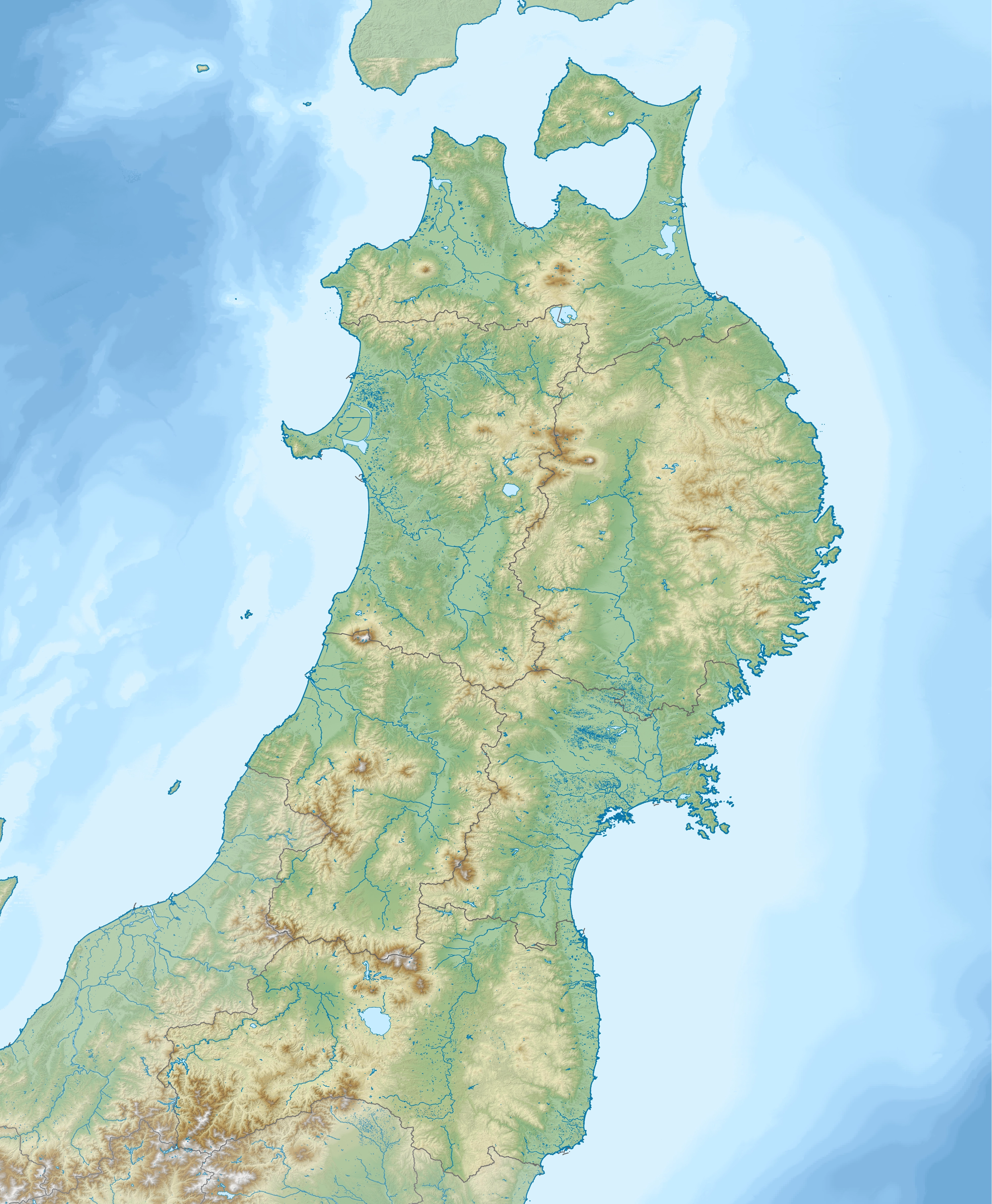
- Location within Tohoku, Japan Location within Japan
- Location: Tōhoku, Japan
- Coordinates: 39°38′N 141°58′E
- Area: 285.37 km^{2} (110.18 sq mi)
- Established: 24 May 2013
- Governing body: Ministry of the Environment (Japan)

Sanriku Fukkō National Park (三陸復興国立公園, Sanriku Fukkō Kokuritsu Kōen; lit. 'Sanriku Reconstruction National Park') is a national park extending along the Sanriku Coast of Japan from Hachinohe in Aomori Prefecture through Iwate Prefecture to Kesennuma in Miyagi Prefecture. The national park was created on 24 May 2013 and covers a land area of 28,537 hectares (110.18 sq mi).

== History ==
On 2 May 1955 the Rikuchū Kaigan National Park (陸中海岸国立公園, Rikuchū Kaigan Kokuritsu Kōen) was created in the Tōhoku region of Honshū in northern Japan. The park extended for 180 kilometers from north to south along the coastline of the Pacific Ocean from northern Miyagi prefecture to northern Iwate prefecture. It had a land area of 121.98 square kilometers (47.10 mi^{2}). On 24 May 2013 the park was incorporated into Sanriku Fukkō National Park. This was in the aftermath of the 2011 Tōhoku earthquake and tsunami. It also includes the former Tanesashi Kaigan Hashikamidake Prefectural Natural Park. On 31 March 2015, the Ministry of the Environment extended the park to include the former Minami Sanriku Kinkasan Quasi-National Park. Subsequently, the park will be extended to include Kesennuma Prefectural Natural Park, Kenjōsan Mangokuura Prefectural Natural Park, and Matsushima Prefectural Natural Park.

== Geography ==
The entire coastline is noted for examples of sea erosion, with numerous rock pillars and islands. The northern coast is an example of an uplifted coastline, and is an area which has been subject to several strong earthquakes and tsunami in recent history. The southern coast is an example of a ria coastline of submerged river valleys, with deep inlets and narrow peninsulas, forming many small bays and coves.

At the northern part of the national park there is an 8-kilometer-long (5.0 mi) and 200-meter-high (660 ft) set of cliffs called the Kita Yamazaki. The scenic coastal rock formations are nicknamed the "Alps of the Sea".

== Related municipalities ==
Aomori: Hachinohe, Hashikami
Iwate: Fudai, Iwaizumi, Kamaishi, Kuji, Miyako, Noda, Ōfunato, Ōtsuchi, Rikuzentakata, Tanohata, Yamada
Miyagi: Ishinomaki, Kesennuma, Minamisanriku, Onagawa, Tome

== Flora and fauna ==
Flora includes groves of Japanese red pine, rhododendrons and Rosa rugosa. Fauna includes numerous bird species, including the black-tailed gull and shearwater. In terms of larger animals, there have also been sightings of the kamoshika.

== Gallery ==
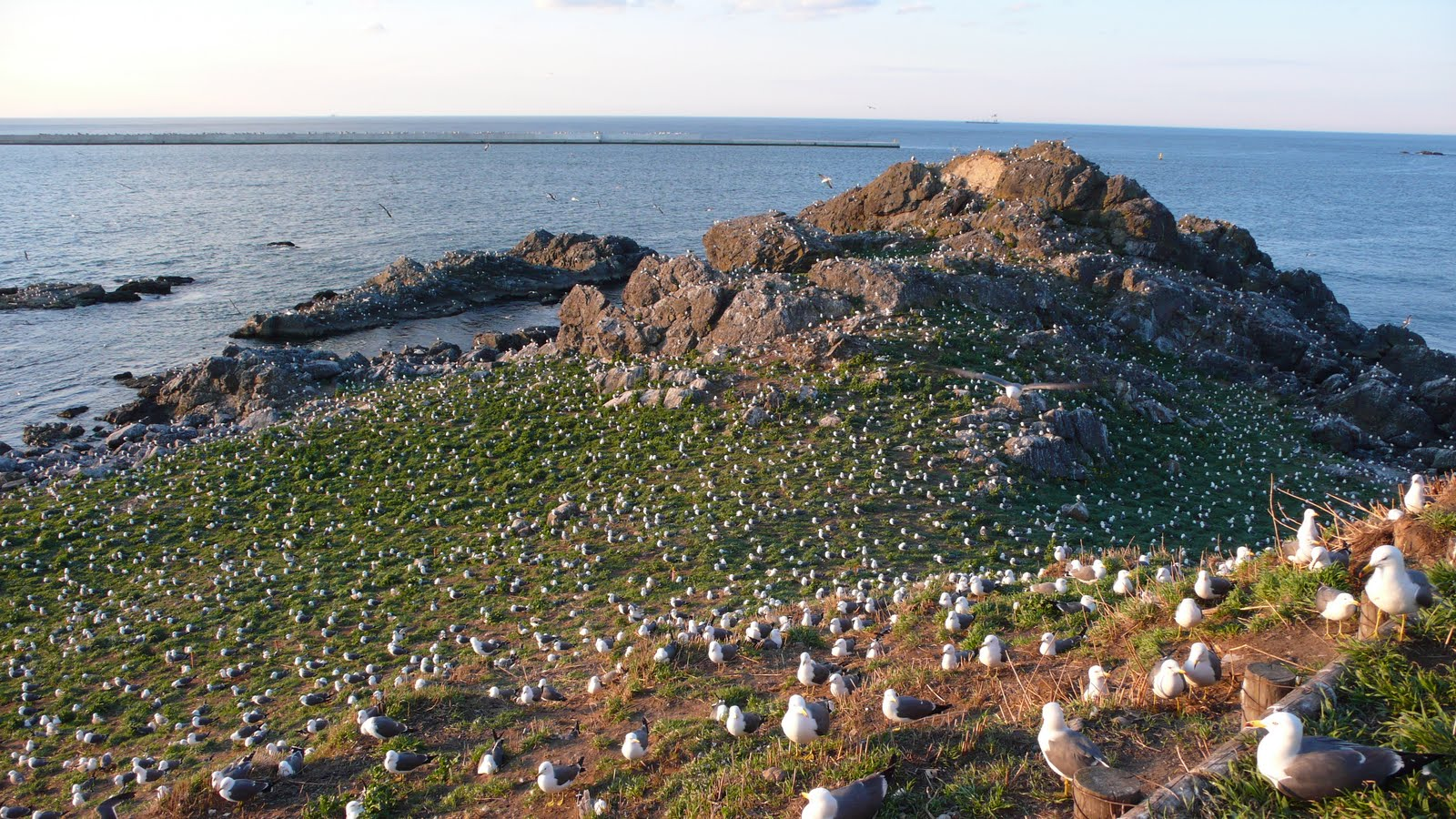
Kabushima Black-tailed gull large breeding ground

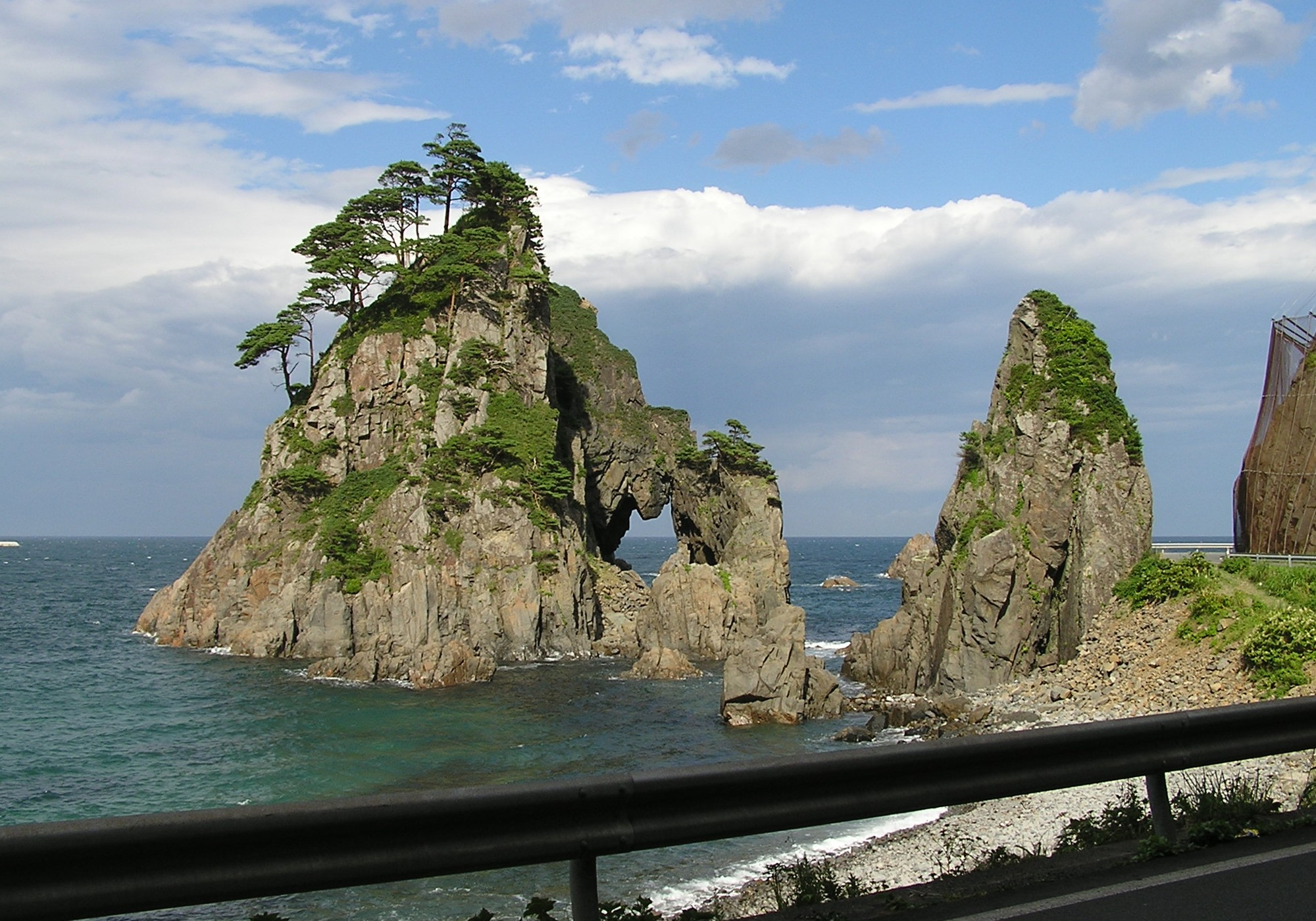
Kosode coast with a suspended cave

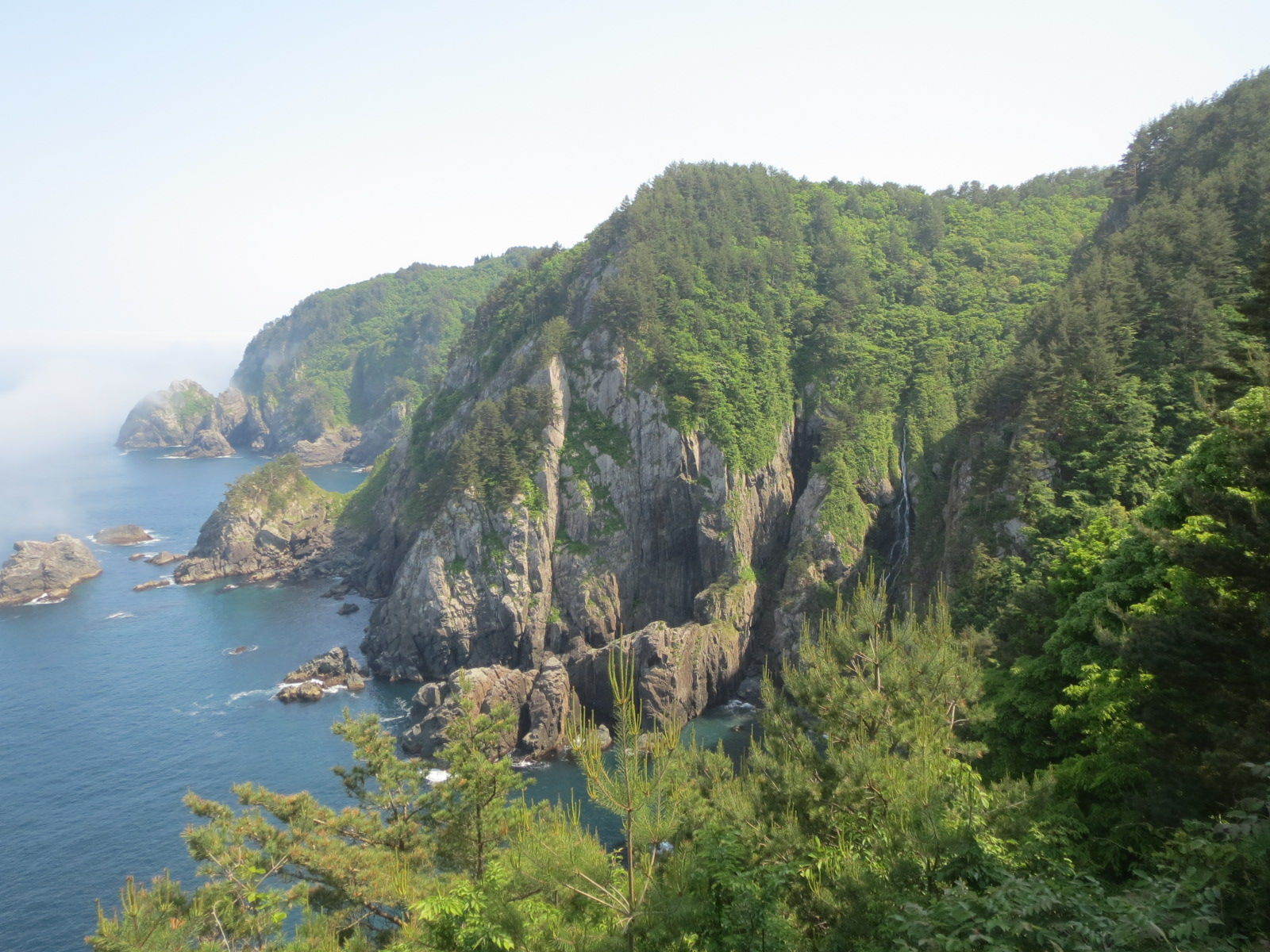
Kurosaki / Anmoura Observatory

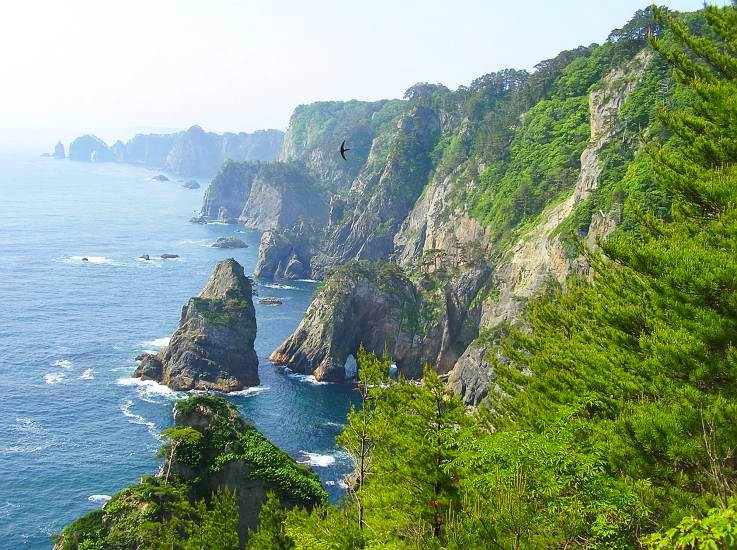
Kitayamazaki

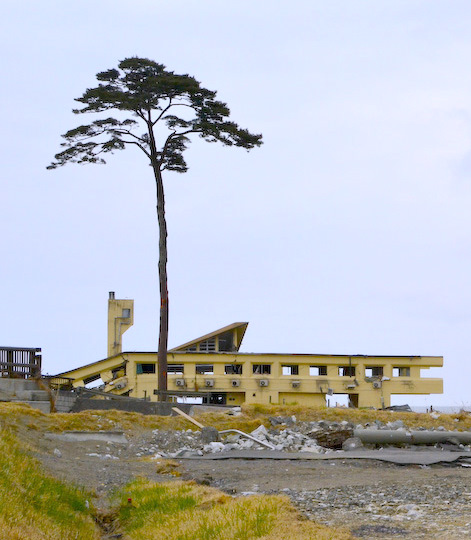
Miracle ipponmatsu

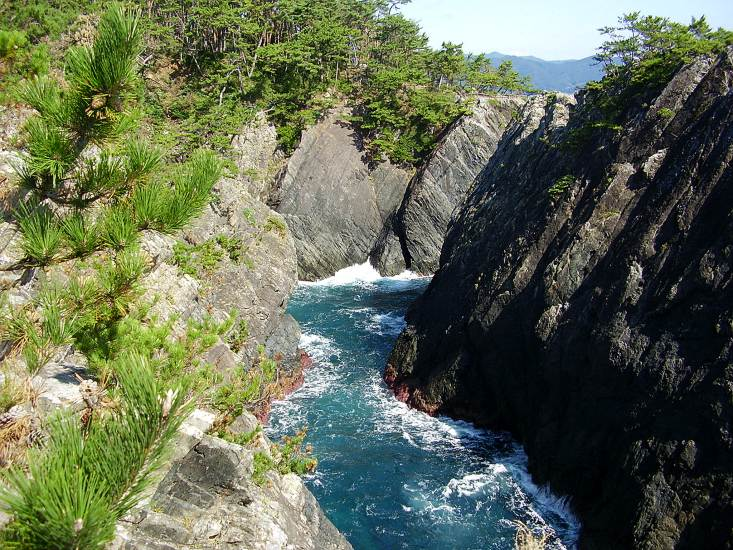
Goishi Coast

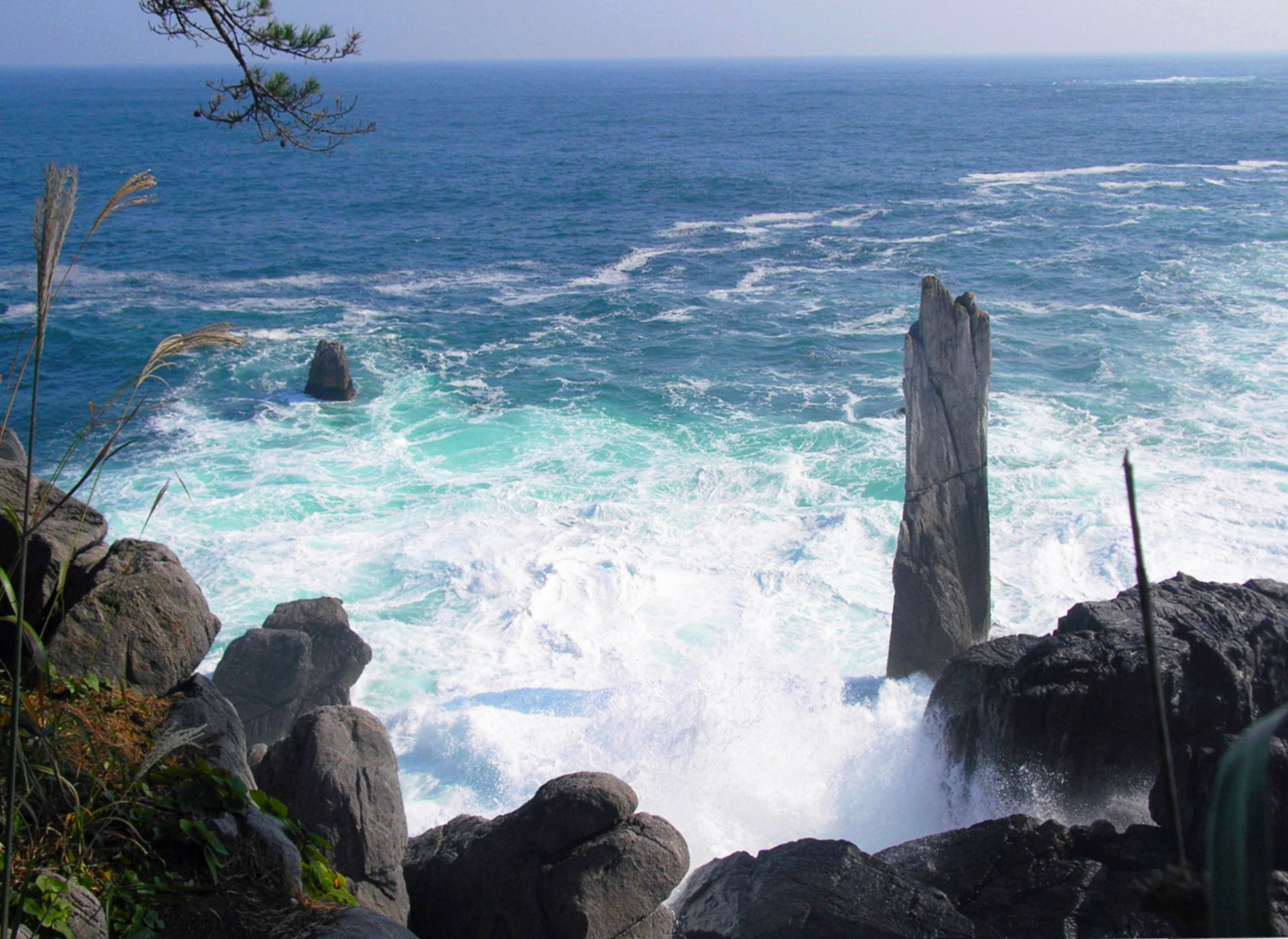
Oogamahanzo

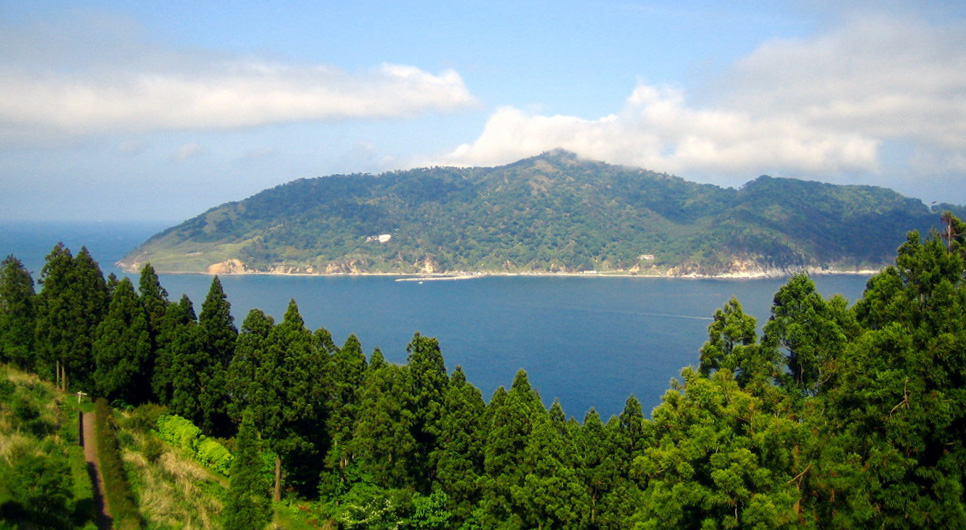
Kinkasan island

== See also ==
- List of national parks of Japan
