= Mount Funagata =

Mountain in Tōhoku, Japan

- 船形山
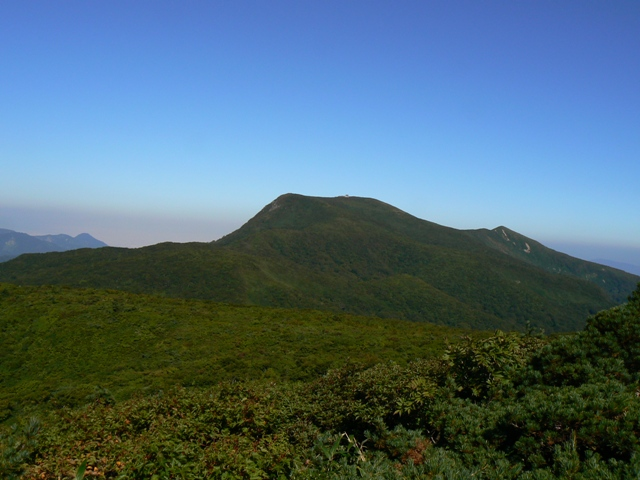
- peak of Mount Funagata

Highest point
- Elevation: 1,500.34 m (4,922.4 ft)
- Listing: List of mountains and hills of Japan by height List of volcanoes in Japan
- Coordinates: 38°27′20″N 140°37′12.3″E

Geography
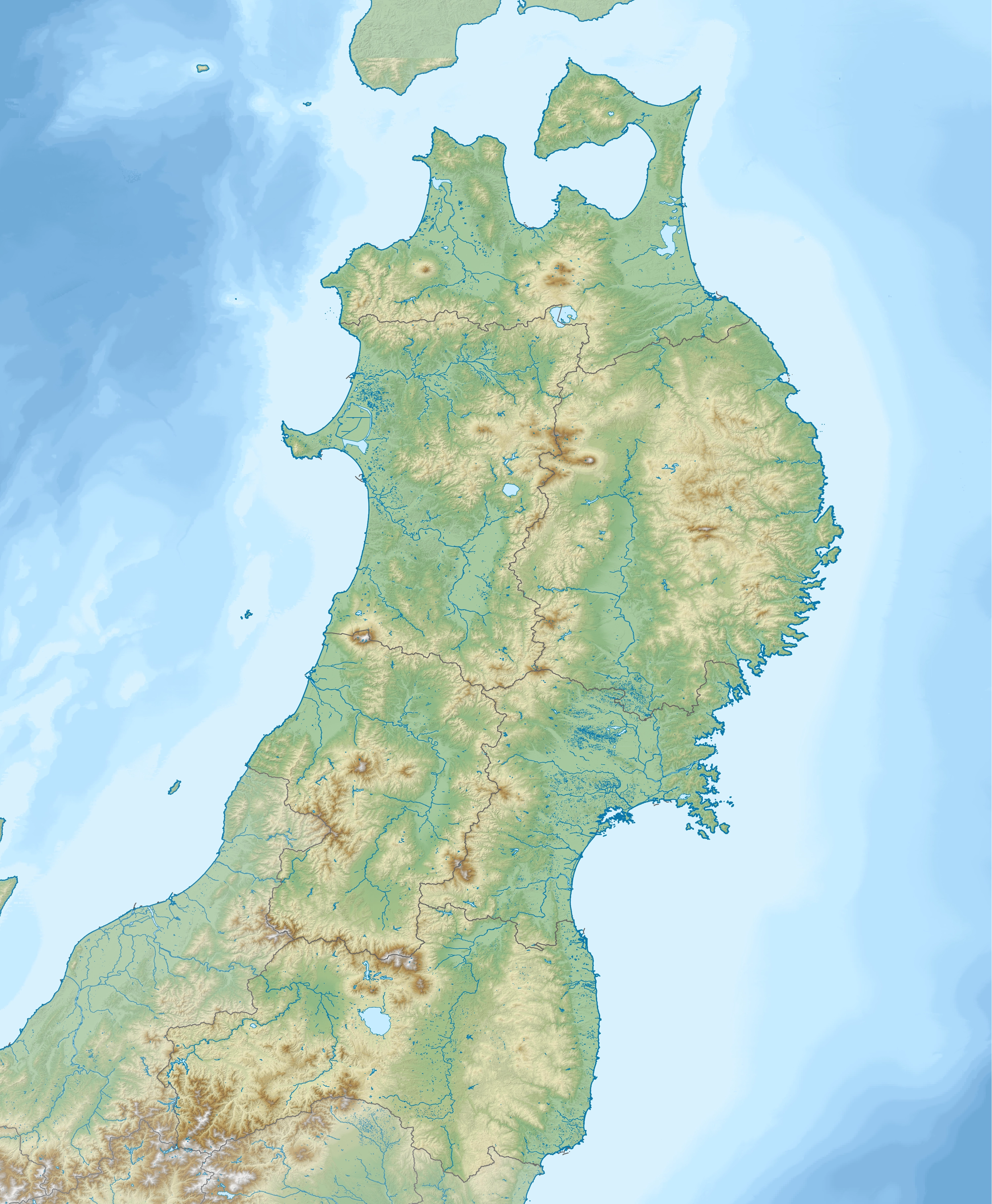
- Location within Sendai Location within Yamagata Prefecture Location within Miyagi Prefecture Location within Tohoku, Japan Location within Japan
- Location: Yamagata and Miyagi Prefectures, Japan
- Parent range: Ōu Mountains

Geology
- Mountain type: Stratovolcano

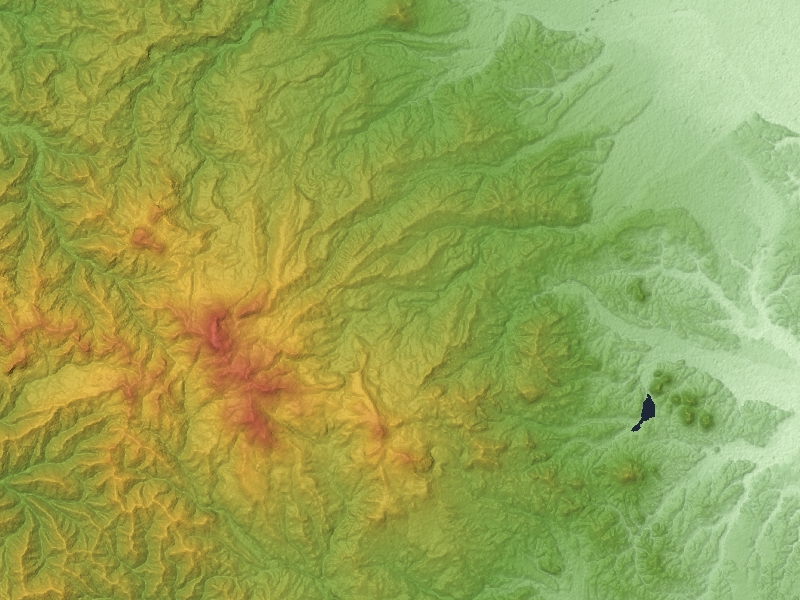
Mount Funagata relief map

Mount Funagata (船形山, Funagata-yama) is a mountain within the Ōu Mountains on the border of Miyagi Prefecture and Yamagata Prefecture in the Tōhoku region of northern Japan. It is listed as one of the "200 famous mountains of Japan" and has a height of 1,500.34 metres (4,922.4 ft). The mountain is also known as Mount Goshō (御所山, Gosho-yama) when viewed from Yamagata prefecture.

== Name ==
Several mountains around Japan are called "Funagata" due to their resemblance to the hull of a boat when viewed from certain angles. The name of "Mount Goshō" comes from a local legend that exiled Emperor Juntoku escaped from his prison on Sado island and lived in obscurity at the base of this mountain. Yet another legend states that the name comes from the five peaks of the mountain. This has also led to the term Funagata Mountains (船形連峰, Funagata-renpō), which is used in the name of Funagata Renpō Prefectural Natural Park, although all five peaks are part of the same stratovolcano. The other peaks that compose the Funagata volcano include Mount Ushiroshirahige (後白髪山), Mount Mitsumine (三峰山), and Mount Izumigatake (泉ヶ岳). Izumigatake is the most famous of these mountains, with two ski resorts and several camping areas. Izumigatake is also the namesake of Izumi-ku, Sendai.

Mount Kurohana (黒鼻山) was traditionally considered part of Mount Funagata; however, recent research has revealed that Mount Kurohana should be considered a separate volcano.

== Geology ==
Mount Funagata is an active stratovolcano formed from the end of the Tertiary period to the beginning of the Quaternary when the Ōu Mountains were raised from the sea. Mount Izumigatake is the oldest peak, created around 1.2 million years ago. The current main mountain body was completed by repeated volcanic activity from 600,000 to 850,000 years ago. Mount Funagata is made up of andesite, which is easily distinguished from the pigeonite basalt that erupted from Mout Kurohana. The crater that produced Mount Izumigatake is located on a ridge between Izumigatake and Kita-izumigatake (North Izumigatake).

== Bibliography ==
- 吉田武義 (October 1996). "船形火山". In 地学団体研究会 (ed.). 新版地学事典 (新版 版 ed.). 平凡社. p. 1141. ISBN 4-582-11506-3.
- 宮崎務 (July 1995). "日本の火山リスト". In 下鶴大輔; 荒巻重雄; 井田喜明 (eds.). 火山の事典. 朝倉書店. pp. 464–465. ISBN 4-254-16023-2.
- 地学団体研究会仙台支部, ed. (1993). せんだい地学ハイキング. 宝文堂. pp. 38–40. ISBN 4-8323-0057-1.
