= Kesennuma Prefectural Natural Park =

National park in Japan

- 県立自然公園気仙沼
- Interactive map of Kesennuma Prefectural Natural Park
- Location: Miyagi Prefecture, Japan
- Coordinates: 38°51′39″N 141°29′56″E
- Area: 210.79 km^{2} (81.39 sq mi)
- Established: 29 December 1948

Kesennuma Prefectural Natural Park (県立自然公園気仙沼, Kenritsu shizen kōen Kesennuma) is a Prefectural Natural Park in northeast Miyagi Prefecture, Japan. First designated for protection in 1948, the park is within the municipality of Kesennuma. It includes the highlands of the Kitakami Mountains (北上山地) as well as some 12 km of coastline, and encompasses Mount Tokusenjō (徳仙丈山), celebrated for its rhododendrons, and Ōshima (大島), for its camellias.

== See also ==
- National Parks of Japan
- Rikuchū Kaigan National Park
- Minami Sanriku Kinkasan Quasi-National Park
