= Abukuma Keikoku Prefectural Natural Park =

Natural park in Miyagi Prefecture, Japan

- 阿武隈渓谷県立自然公園
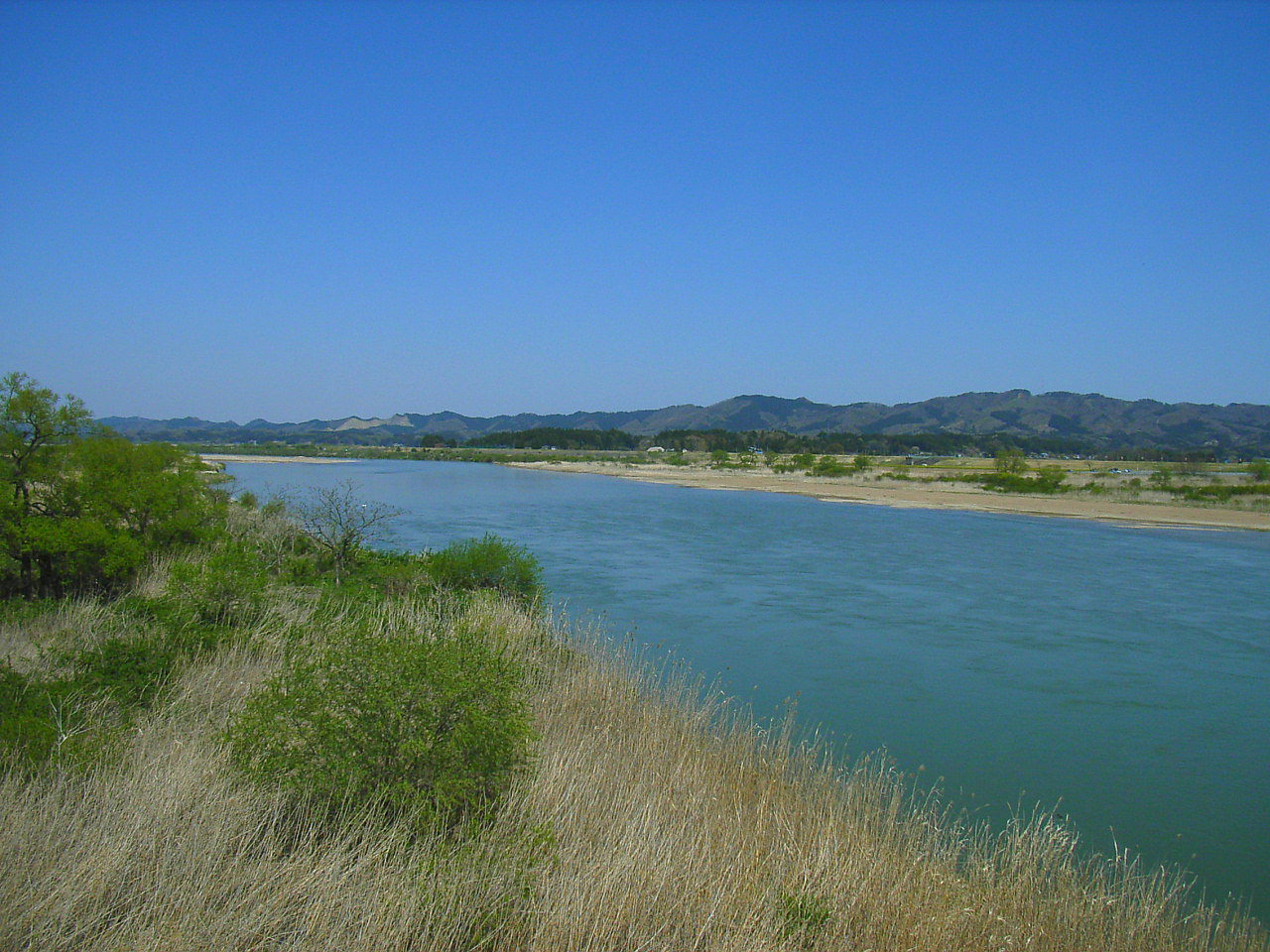
- Abukuma River in neighbouring Kakuda
- Interactive map of Abukuma Keikoku Prefectural Natural Park
- Location: Miyagi Prefecture, Japan
- Coordinates: 37°51′02″N 140°46′38″E
- Area: 43.03 km^{2} (16.61 sq mi)
- Established: 22 November 1988

Abukuma Keikoku Prefectural Natural Park (阿武隈渓谷県立自然公園, Abukuma Keikoku kenritsu shizen kōen) is a Prefectural Natural Park in southern Miyagi Prefecture, Japan. First designated for protection in 1988, the park is within the municipality of Marumori and centres upon the Abukuma River valley.

== See also ==
- National Parks of Japan
