= Kenjōsan Mangokuura Prefectural Natural Park =

Natural park in Miyagi Prefecture, Japan

- 硯上山万石浦県立自然公園
- IUCN category II (national park)
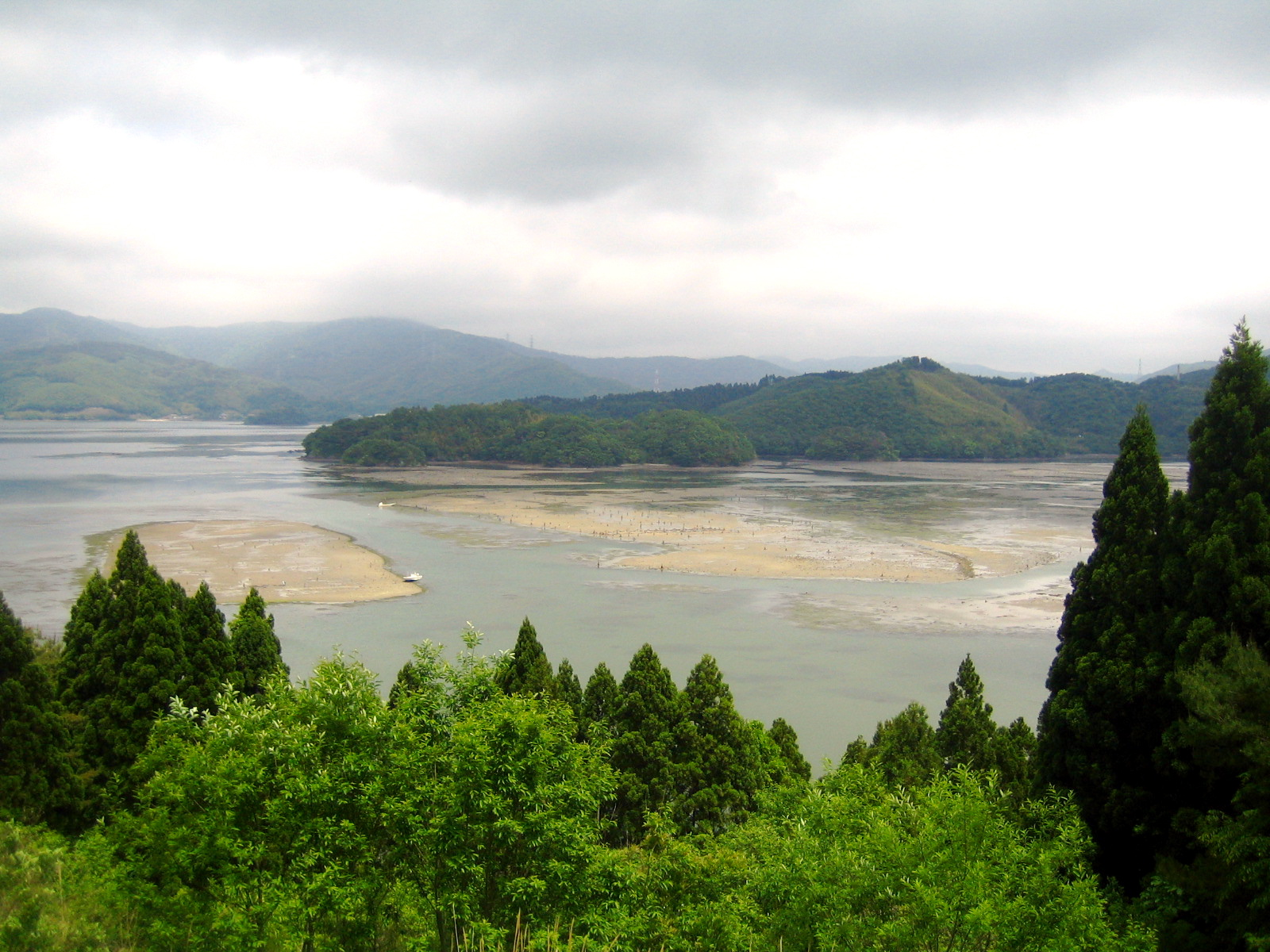
- Mangoku Bay

- Location within Miyagi Prefecture Location within Japan
- Location: Miyagi Prefecture, Japan
- Coordinates: 38°24′21″N 141°24′04″E
- Area: 99.33 km^{2} (38.35 sq mi)
- Established: 26 October 1979

Kenjōsan Mangokuura Prefectural Natural Park (硯上山万石浦県立自然公園, Kenjōsan Mangokuura kenritsu shizen kōen) is a Prefectural Natural Park in eastern Miyagi Prefecture, Japan. First designated for protection in 1979, the park spans the municipalities of Ishinomaki and Onagawa.

== See also ==
- National Parks of Japan
- Minami Sanriku Kinkasan Quasi-National Park
