= Asahiyama Prefectural Natural Park =

Prefectural Natural Park in Miyagi Prefecture, Japan

- 県立自然公園旭山
- IUCN category II (national park)
- Interactive map of Asahiyama Prefectural Natural Park
- Location: Miyagi Prefecture, Japan
- Coordinates: 38°28′39″N 141°10′03″E
- Area: 0.34 km^{2} (0.13 sq mi)
- Established: 13 September 1940

Asahiyama Prefectural Natural Park (県立自然公園旭山, Kenritsu shizen kōen Asahiyama) is a Prefectural Natural Park in Miyagi Prefecture, Japan. First designated for protection in 1940, the park is within the municipality of Ishinomaki and centres upon Mount Asahi.

== See also ==
- National Parks of Japan
