= Funagata Renpō Prefectural Natural Park =

Natural park of Miyagi prefecture, Japan

- 県立自然公園船形連峰
- IUCN category V (protected landscape/seascape)
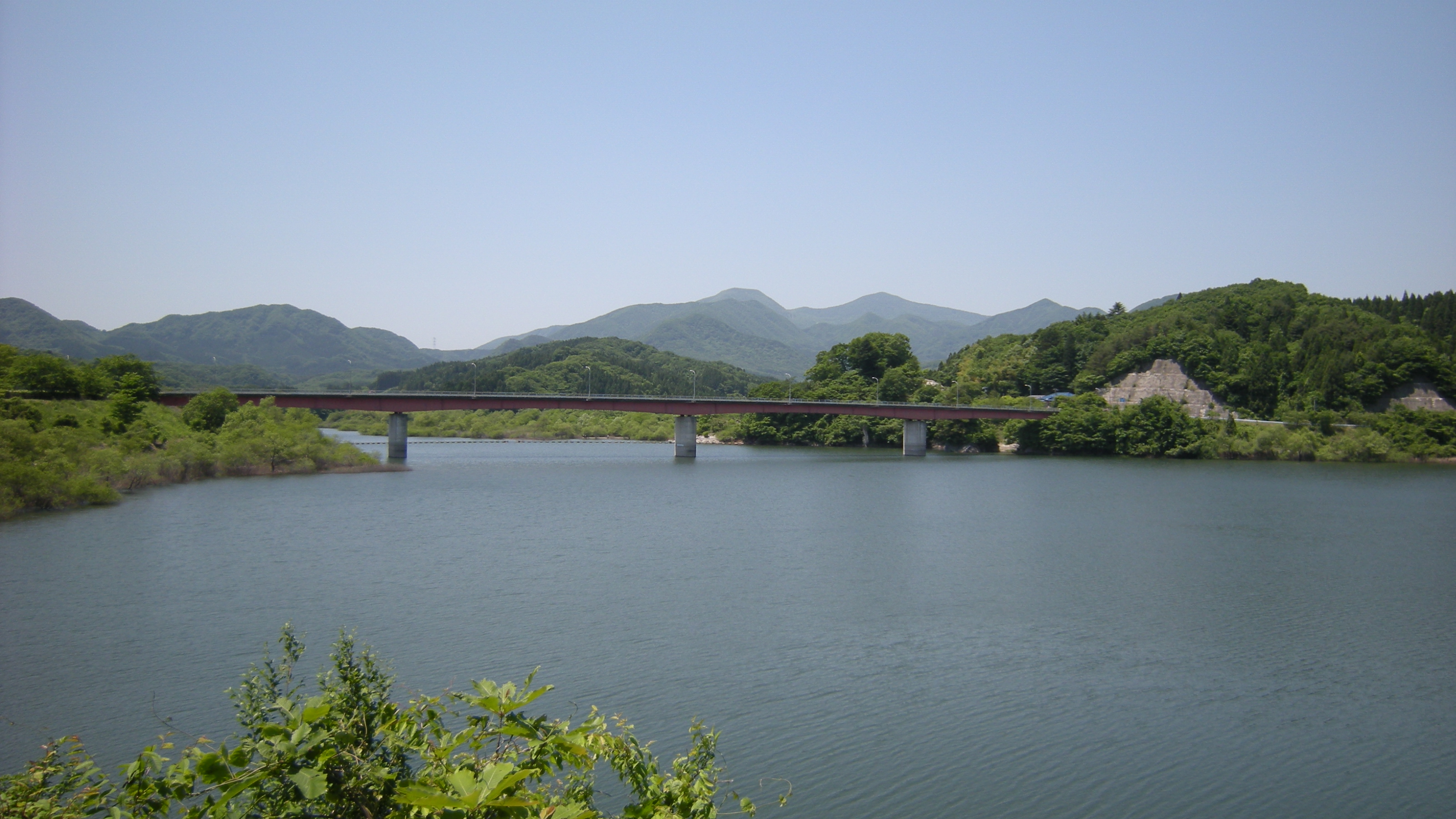
- Mount Izumi

- Location within Miyagi Prefecture Location within Japan
- Location: Honshū, Japan
- Nearest city: Sendai
- Coordinates: 38°27′00″N 140°37′53″E
- Area: 354.49 km^{2} (136.87 sq mi)
- Established: 1 November 1962
- Governing body: Miyagi prefectural government

Funagata Renpō Prefectural Natural Park (県立自然公園船形連峰, Kenritsu shizen kōen Funagata Renpō) is a prefectural natural park surrounding Mount Funagata in western Miyagi Prefecture, Japan. First designated for protection in 1962, the park spans the municipalities of Kami, Sendai, Shikama, and Taiwa. Wildlife includes the Japanese serow (a special natural monument), stoat, red-flanked bluetail and forest green tree frog.

== See also ==
- National Parks of Japan
