= Matsushima Prefectural Natural Park =

Preserved area in Miyagi Prefecture, Japan

- 県立自然公園松島
- IUCN category II (national park)
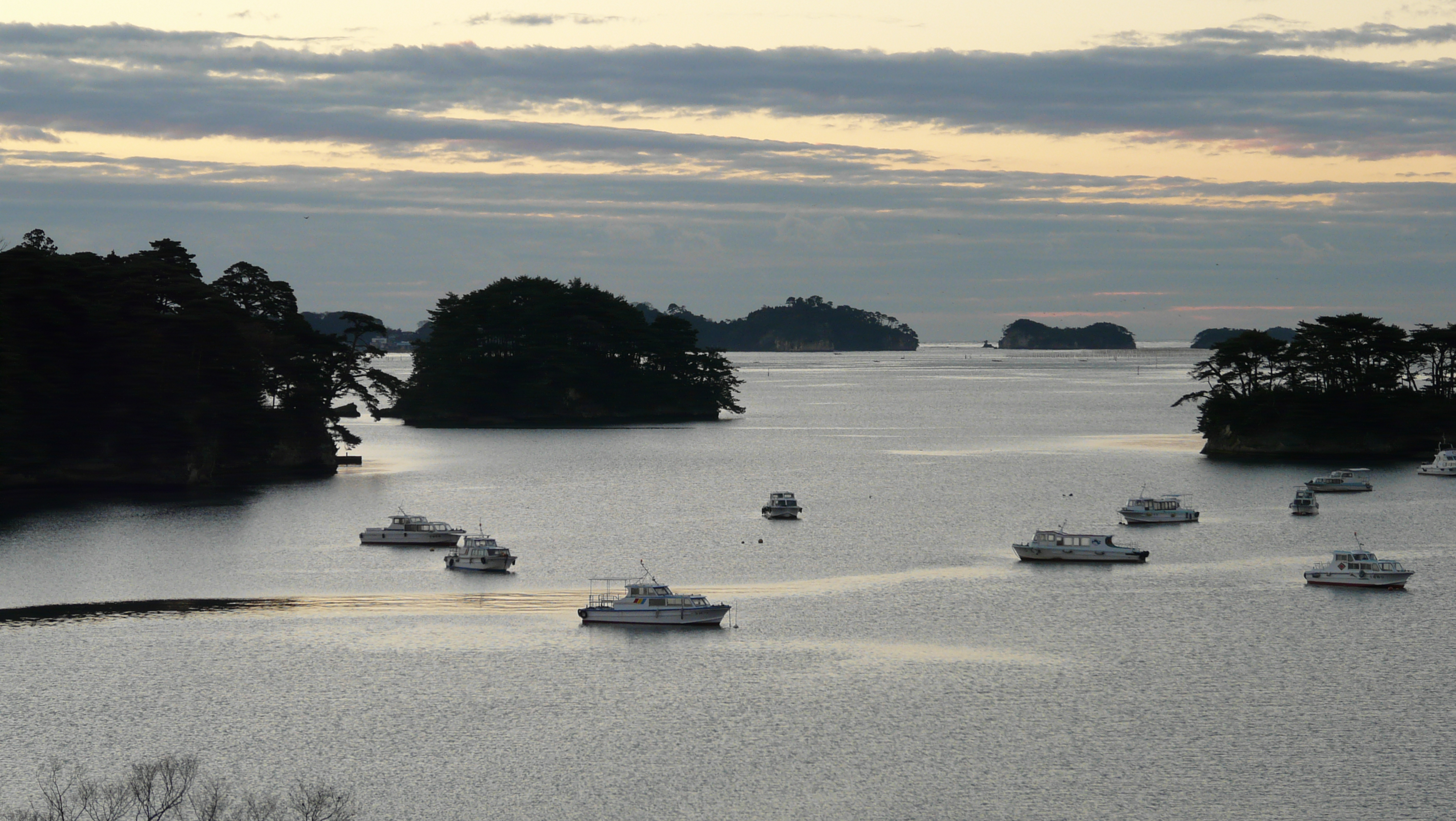
- Matsushima

- Location within Miyagi Prefecture Location within Japan
- Location: Miyagi Prefecture, Japan
- Coordinates: 38°21′12″N 141°03′51″E
- Area: 54.10 km^{2} (20.89 sq mi)
- Established: 9 September 1902

Matsushima Prefectural Natural Park (県立自然公園松島, Kenritsu shizen kōen Matsushima) is a Prefectural Natural Park on the east coast of Miyagi Prefecture, Japan. First designated for protection in 1902, the park spans the municipalities of Higashimatsushima, Matsushima, Rifu, Shichigahama, and Shiogama. The park centres upon the eponymous pine islands of Matsushima (Special Place of Scenic Beauty).

== See also ==
- National Parks of Japan
- List of Special Places of Scenic Beauty, Special Historic Sites and Special Natural Monuments
- Minami Sanriku Kinkasan Quasi-National Park
