= Minami Sanriku Kinkasan Quasi-National Park =

Coordinates: 38°32′3″N 141°30′58″E

- 南三陸金華山国定公園
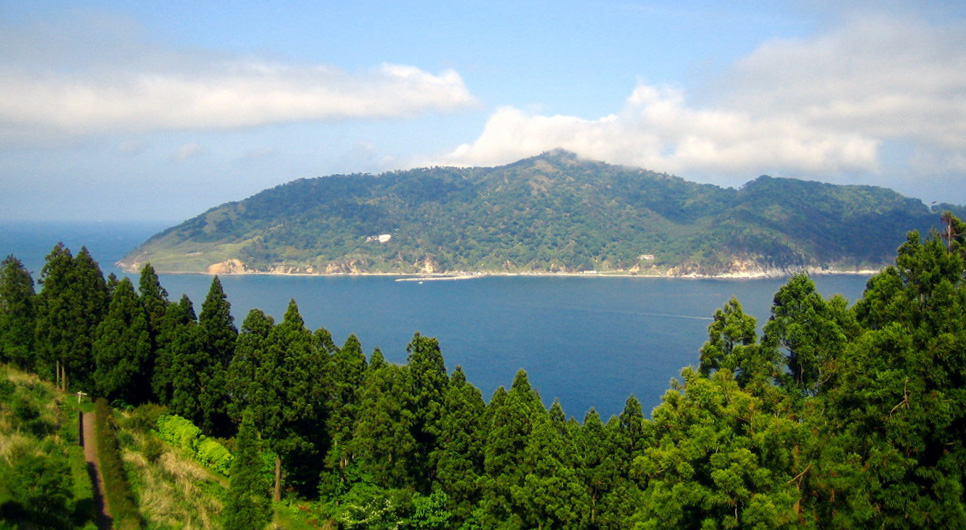
- Kinkasan
- Interactive map of Minami Sanriku Kinkasan Quasi-National Park
- Location: Miyagi Prefecture, Japan
- Area: 139.02 km^{2} (53.68 sq mi)
- Established: 30 March 1979

Minami Sanriku Kinkasan Quasi-National Park (南三陸金華山国定公園, Minami Sanriku Kinkasan Kokutei Kōen) was a Quasi-National Park on the Pacific coast of northern Miyagi Prefecture, Japan. Established in 1979, the park extended along 180 km of the coast of southern Sanriku and encompassed Mount Kinka. On 31 March 2015, in the aftermath of the 2011 Tōhoku earthquake and tsunami, the Park was incorporated into Sanriku Fukkō National Park.

== Related municipalities ==
- Ishinomaki, Kesennuma, Minamisanriku, Onagawa, Tome

== See also ==
- National Parks of Japan
