= Miyagi Prefecture =

Prefecture of Japan

Coordinates: 38°21′N 140°58′E

Miyagi Prefecture 宮城県
- Prefecture

Japanese transcription(s)
  - Japanese: 宮城県
  - Rōmaji: Miyagi-ken
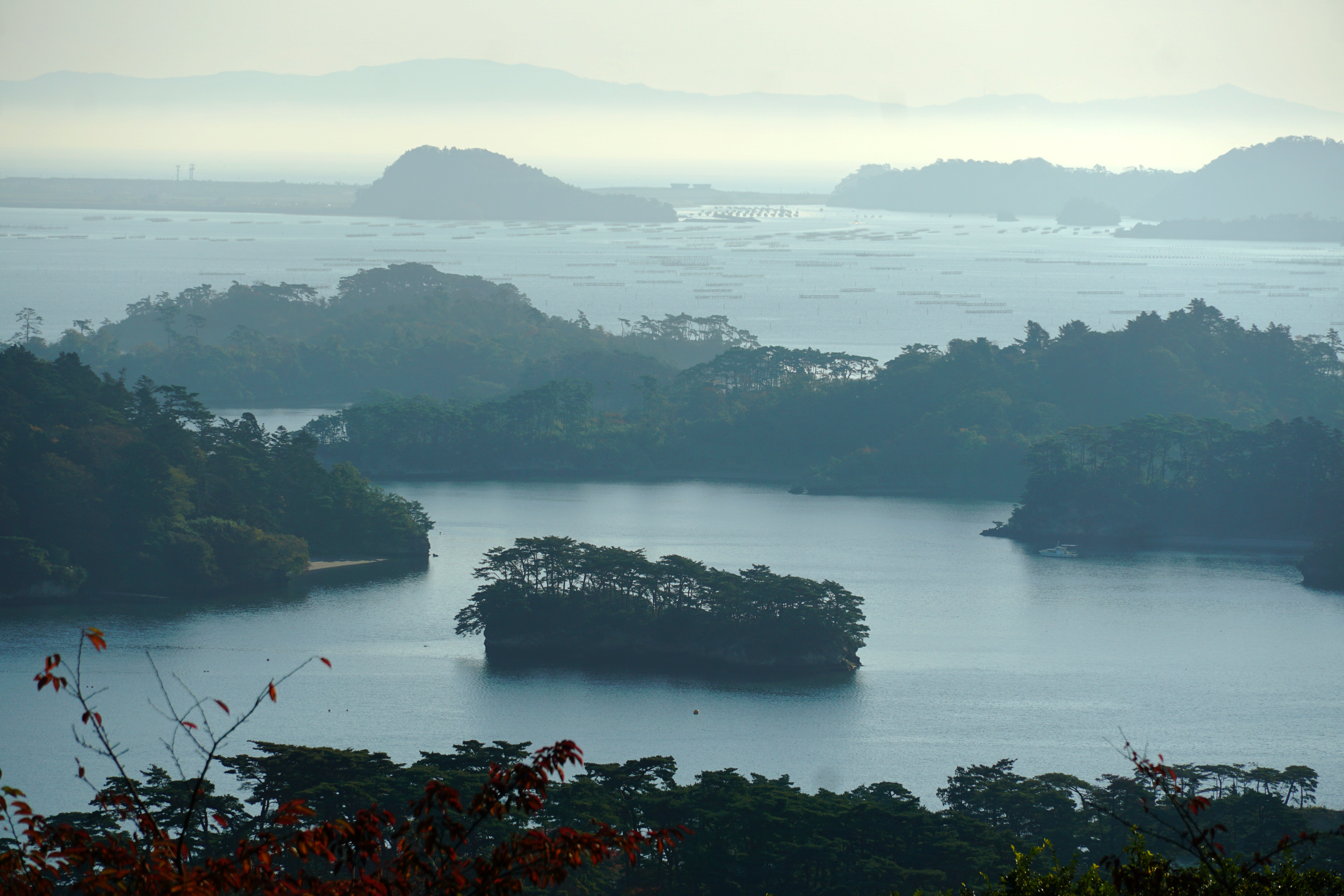
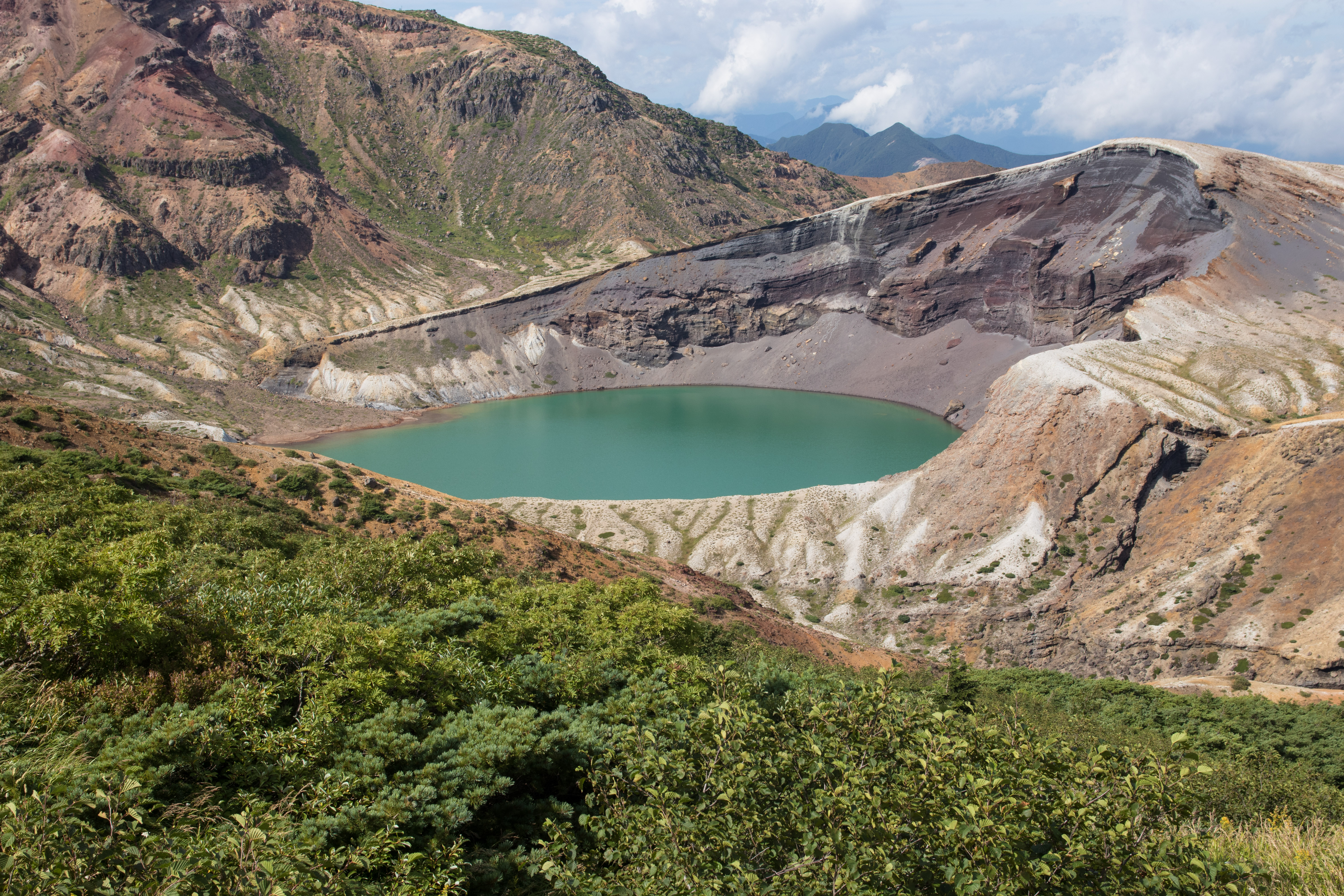
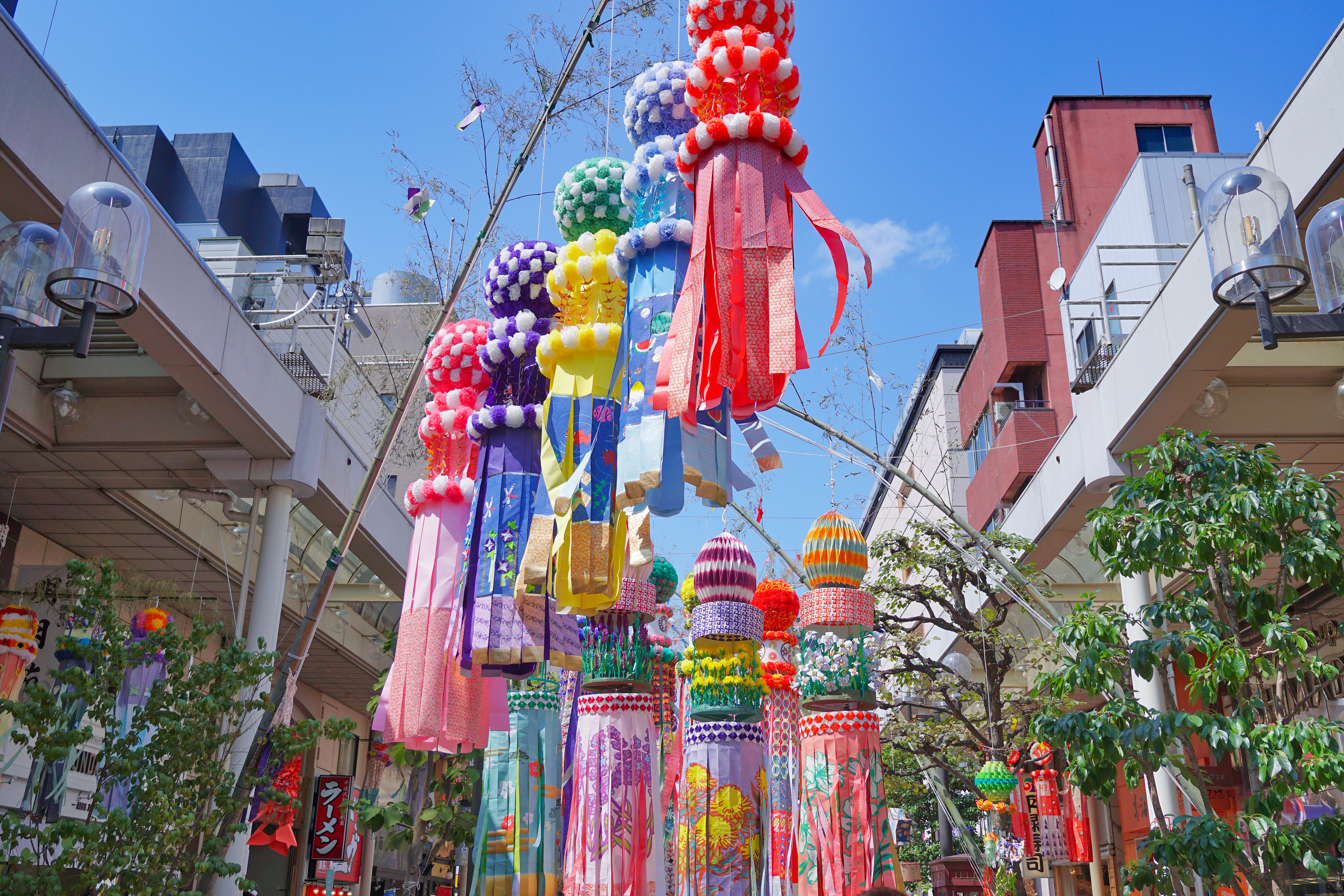
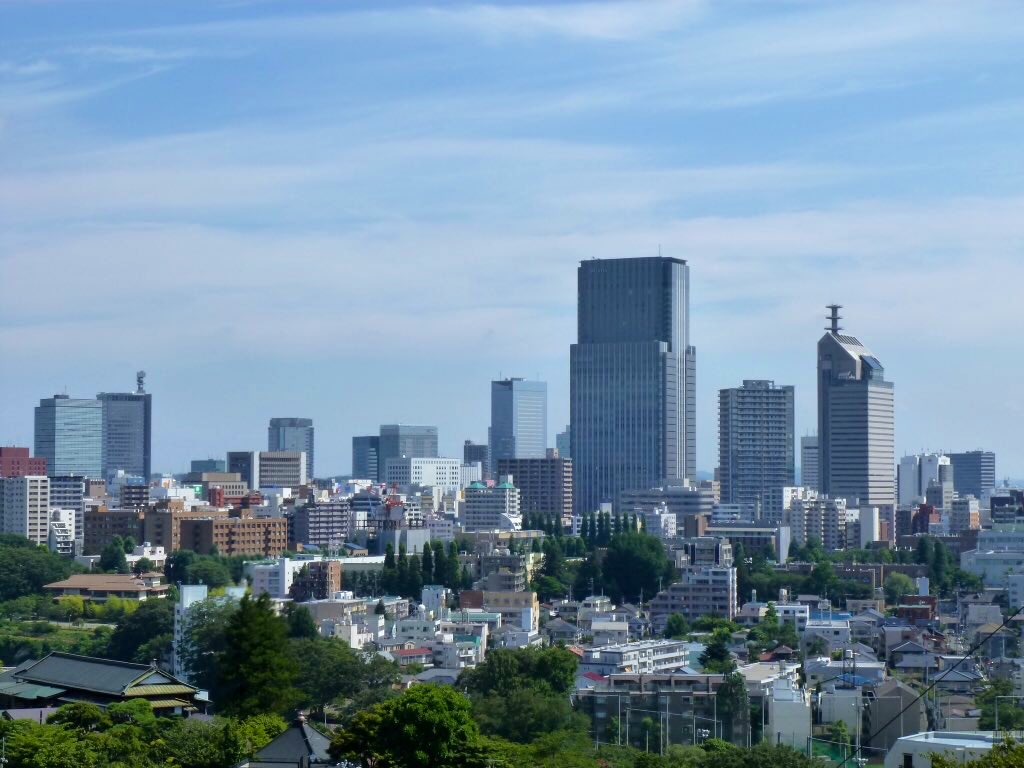
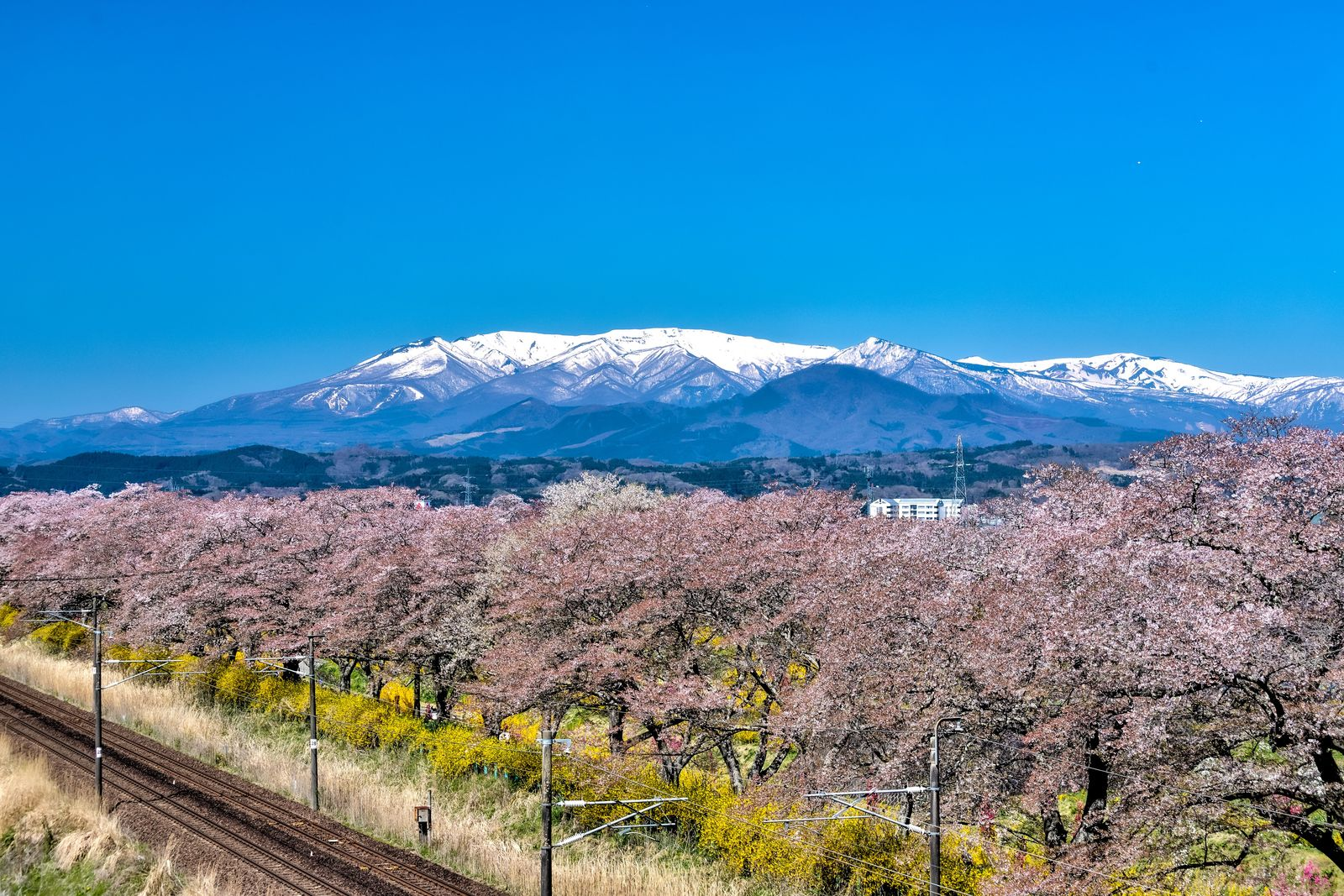
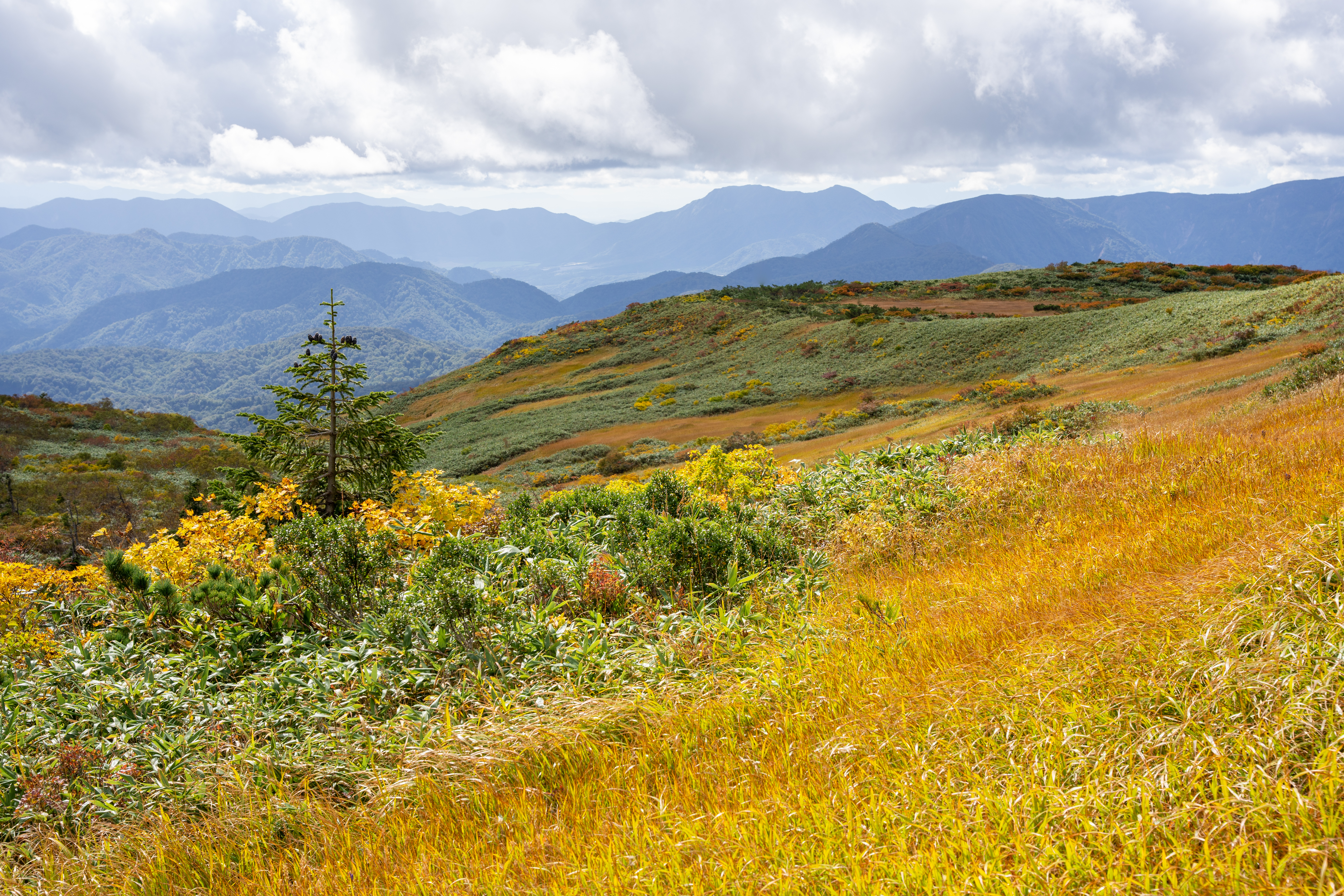
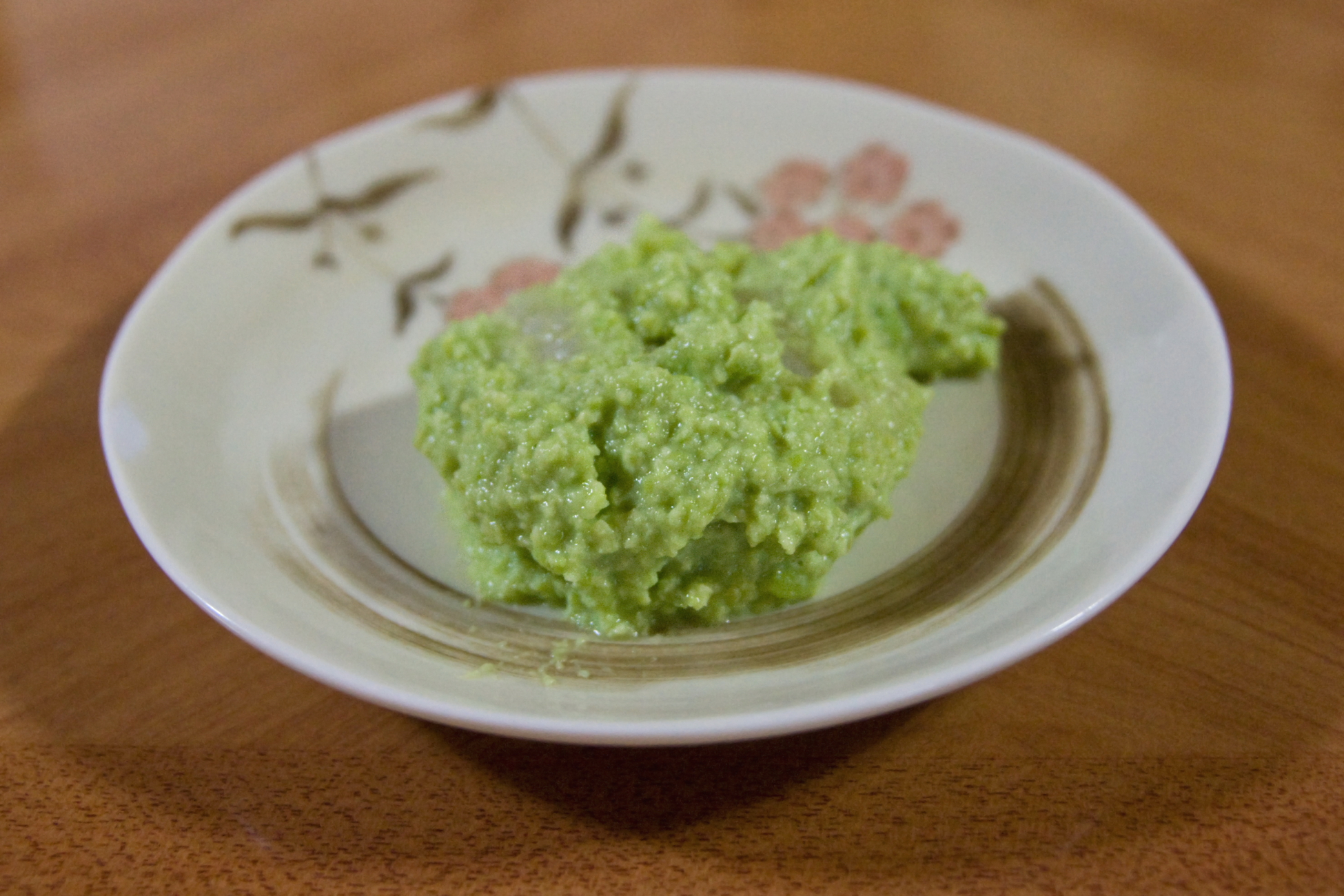
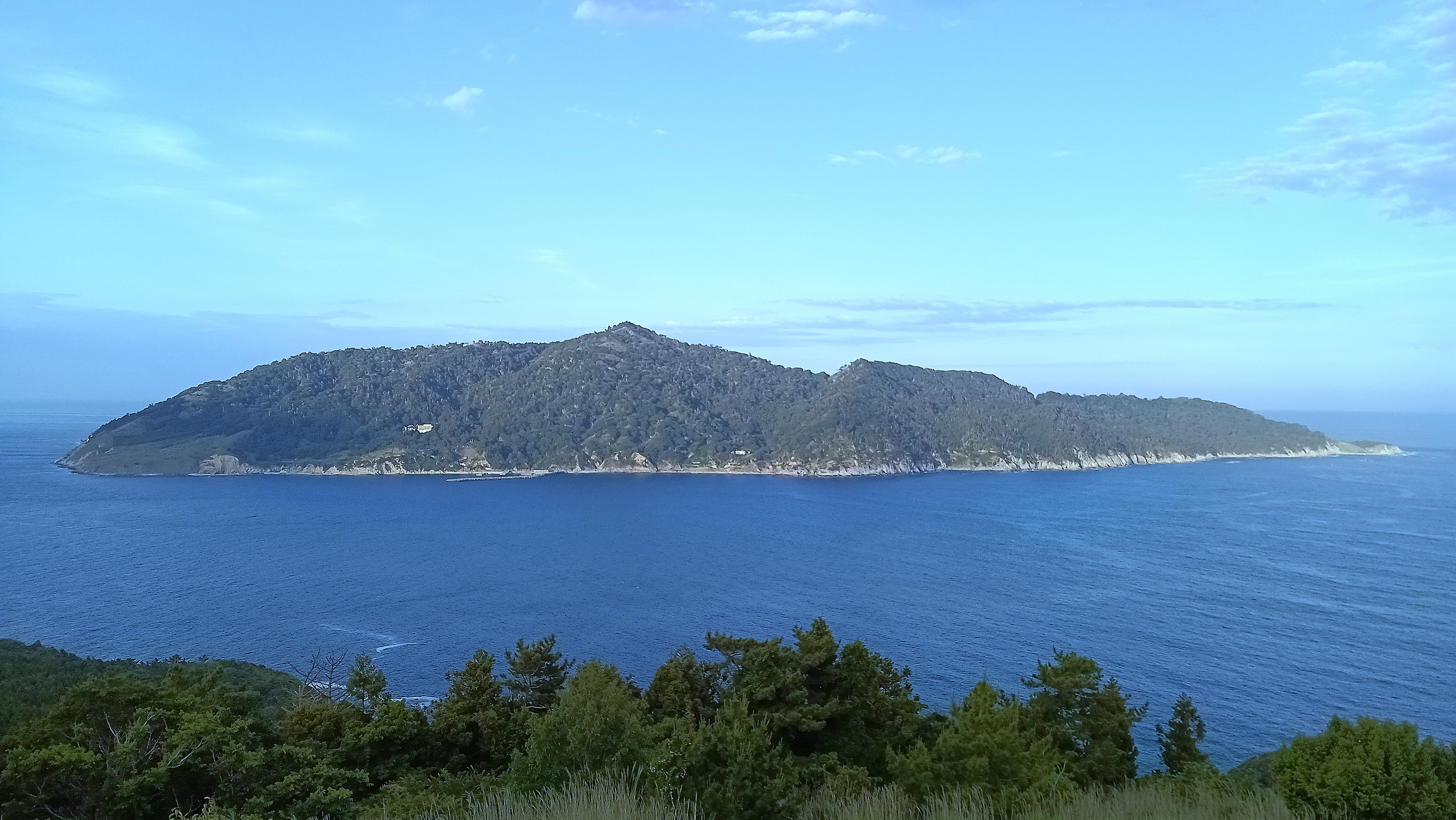
- Matsushima Okama Crater Lake in Mount Zao Sendai Street Tanabata on August Sky line of Sendai city First Glance Thousand Tree of Cherry blossoms in Ōkawara Autumn colour in Mount Kurikoma Zunda sweets Kinkasan

- Flag Symbol
- Anthem: Kagayaku Kyōdo
- Country: Japan
- Region: Tōhoku
- Island: Honshu
- Capital: Sendai
- Subdivisions: Districts: 10, Municipalities: 35

Government
  - Governor: Yoshihiro Murai

Area
  - Total: 7,282.22 km^{2} (2,811.68 sq mi)
  - Rank: 16th

Population (August 1, 2023)
  - Total: 2,265,724
  - Rank: 15th
  - Density: 311.131/km^{2} (805.825/sq mi)

GDP
  - Total: JP¥ 9,615 billion US$ 71 billion (2022)
- ISO 3166 code: JP-04
- Website: www.pref.miyagi.jp
- Symbols of Japan
- Bird: Wild goose
- Flower: Miyagi bush clover (Lespedeza thunbergii)
- Tree: Japanese zelkova (Zelkova serrata)

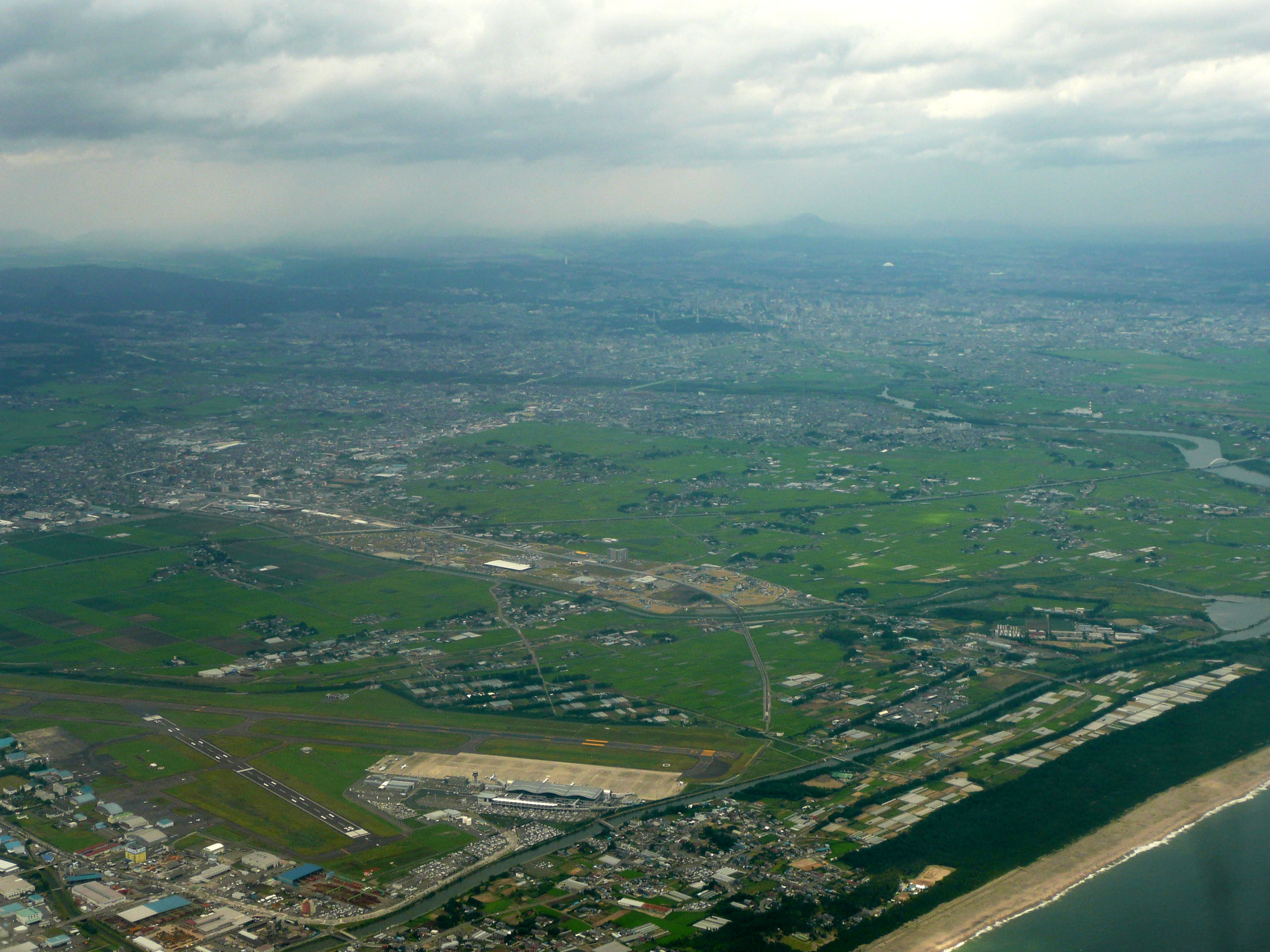
Panoramic view of Sendai plain, spreading to Sendai metropolitan area in Miyagi Prefecture

Miyagi Prefecture (宮城県, Miyagi-ken; Japanese pronunciation: [mʲí.jä̀.ɡ̟ʲì, -ŋ̟ʲì, mʲì.jä́.ɡ̟ʲí.kè̞ɴ̀, -ŋ̟ʲí-]) is a prefecture of Japan located in the Tōhoku region of Honshu. Miyagi Prefecture has a population of 2,265,724 (1 August 2023) and has a geographic area of 7,282 km^{2} (2,812 sq mi). Miyagi Prefecture borders Iwate Prefecture to the north, Akita Prefecture to the northwest, Yamagata Prefecture to the west, and Fukushima Prefecture to the south.

Sendai is the capital and largest city of Miyagi Prefecture, and the largest city in the Tōhoku region, with other major cities including Ishinomaki, Ōsaki, and Tome. Miyagi Prefecture is located on Japan's eastern Pacific coast and bounded to the west by the Ōu Mountains, the longest mountain range in Japan, with 24% of its total land area being designated as Natural Parks. Miyagi Prefecture is home to Matsushima Islands, a group of islands containing one of the Three Views of Japan, near the town of Matsushima.

== History ==
Miyagi Prefecture was formerly part of the province of Mutsu.

=== 2011 Tōhoku earthquake and tsunami ===
On March 11, 2011, a 9.0 magnitude earthquake and a subsequent major tsunami hit Miyagi Prefecture, causing major damage to the area. The tsunami was estimated to be approximately 10 metres (33 ft) high in Miyagi Prefecture.

On April 7, 2011, a magnitude 7.4 earthquake struck off the coast of Miyagi, Japan. Workers were then evacuated from the nearby troubled Fukushima Daiichi Nuclear Power Plant once again, as a tsunami warning was issued for the coastline. Residents were told to flee inland at that time.

In 2013, Crown Prince Naruhito and Crown Princess Masako visited the prefecture to see the progress made since the tsunami.

== Geography ==
Map of Miyagi Prefecture Government Ordinance Designated City City Town Village

Miyagi Prefecture is in the central part of Tōhoku, facing the Pacific Ocean, and contains Tōhoku's largest city, Sendai. There are high mountains on the west and along the northeast coast, but the central plain around Sendai is fairly large.

Matsushima is known as one of the three most scenic views of Japan, with a bay full of 260 small islands covered in pine groves.

Oshika Peninsula projects from the northern coastline of the prefecture.

As of 31 March 2019, 24% of the total land area of the prefecture was designated as Natural Parks, namely the Sanriku Fukkō National Park; Kurikoma and Zaō Quasi-National Parks; and Abukuma Keikoku, Asahiyama, Funagata Renpō, Futakuchi Kyōkoku, Kenjōsan Mangokuura, Kesennuma, Matsushima, and Zaō Kōgen Prefectural Natural Parks.

In addition, Miyagi Prefecture is a prefecture that is particularly prone to earthquakes even in Japan, which is an earthquake-prone country. Large earthquakes occur frequently Miyagi offshore, and earthquakes also occur frequently inland. In the 2011 Tohoku earthquake that occurred Miyagi offshore, Miyagi Prefecture suffered the most damage nationwide.

=== Cities ===
Fourteen cities are located in Miyagi Prefecture:

Name		Area (km^{2})	Population	Population density (per km^{2})	Map
Rōmaji	Kanji	Area (km^{2})	Population	Population density (per km^{2})	Map
Higashimatsushima	東松島市	101.36	39,098	385.73	
Ishinomaki	石巻市	554.55	140,151	252.73	
Iwanuma	岩沼市	60.45	44,068	729.00	
Kakuda	角田市	147.53	27,976	189.63	
Kesennuma	気仙沼市	332.44	61,147	183.93	
Kurihara	栗原市	804.97	64,637	80.30	
Natori	名取市	98.17	78,718	801.85	
Ōsaki	大崎市	796.76	127,330	159.81	
Sendai (capital)	仙台市	786.3	1,096,704	1394.77	
Shiogama	塩竈市	17.37	52,203	3005.35	
Shiroishi	白石市	286.48	32,758	114.35	
Tagajō	多賀城市	19.69	62,827	3190.81	
Tome	登米市	536.12	76,037	141.83	
Tomiya	富谷市	49.18	51,651	1050.24	

=== Towns and villages ===
These are the towns and villages in each district:

Name		Area (km^{2})	Population	Population density (per km^{2})	District	Type	Map
Rōmaji	Kanji	Area (km^{2})	Population	Population density (per km^{2})	District	Type	Map
Kami	加美町	460.67	21,943	47.63	Kami District	Town	
Kawasaki	川崎町	270.77	8,637	31.90	Shibata District	Town	
Marumori	丸森町	273.3	13,092	47.90	Igu District	Town	
Matsushima	松島町	53.56	13,804	257.73	Miyagi District	Town	
Minamisanriku	南三陸町	163.4	12,516	76.60	Motoyoshi District	Town	
Misato	美里町	74.95	24,565	327.75	Tōda District	Town	
Murata	村田町	78.38	10,675	136.20	Shibata District	Town	
Ōgawara	大河原町	24.99	23,618	945.10	Shibata District	Town	
Ōhira	大衡村	60.32	5,918	98.11	Kurokawa District	Village	
Onagawa	女川町	65.35	6,319	96.69	Oshika District	Town	
Ōsato	大郷町	82.01	7,972	97.31	Kurokawa District	Town	
Rifu	利府町	44.89	36,014	802.27	Miyagi District	Town	
Shibata	柴田町	54.03	37,617	696.22	Shibata District	Town	
Shichigahama	七ヶ浜町	13.19	18,447	1398.56	Miyagi District	Town	
Shichikashuku	七ヶ宿町	263.09	1,323	5.03	Katta District	Town	
Shikama	色麻町	109.28	6,723	61.52	Kami District	Town	
Taiwa	大和町	225.49	28,436	126.11	Kurokawa District	Town	
Wakuya	涌谷町	82.16	15,763	191.86	Tōda District	Town	
Watari	亘理町	73.6	33,459	454.61	Watari District	Town	
Yamamoto	山元町	64.58	12,100	187.36	Watari District	Town	
Zaō	蔵王町	152.83	11,790	77.14	Katta District	Town	

== Economy ==
Although Miyagi has a good deal of fishing and agriculture, producing a great deal of rice and livestock, it is dominated by the manufacturing industries around Sendai, particularly electronics, appliances, and food processing.

As of March 2011, the prefecture produced 4.7% of Japan's beasts, 23% of oysters, and 15.9% of sauries.

In July 2011, the Japanese government decided to ban all shipments of beef cattle from northeast Miyagi Prefecture over fears of radioactive contamination. This has since been rescinded.

== Demographics ==
Miyagi prefecture population pyramid in 2020

According to Japanese census data, Miyagi prefecture experienced its greatest period of growth from 1940 to 1950 and continued to exhibit growth up until the 21st century. Nevertheless, like the majority of Japan, the population of Miyagi has begun to slowly decline. The prefectural capital of Sendai, however, has seen a moderate, but steady rise in population over the past twenty years.

Historical population
Year	Pop.	±%
1890	735,100	—
1920	962,000	+30.9%
1930	1,143,000	+18.8%
1940	1,271,000	+11.2%
1950	1,663,000	+30.8%
1960	1,743,000	+4.8%
1970	1,819,000	+4.4%
1980	2,082,000	+14.5%
1990	2,249,000	+8.0%
2000	2,365,320	+5.2%
2010	2,348,165	−0.7%
2020	2,301,996	−2.0%

== Education ==
=== University ===
- Miyagi University
- Miyagi University of Education
- Miyagi Gakuin Women's University
- Sendai University
- Sendai Shirayuri Women's College
- Tohoku University
- Tohoku Gakuin University
- Tohoku Bunka Gakuen University
- Tohoku Institute of Technology
- Tohoku Fukushi University
- Tohoku Seikatsu Bunka College
- Tohoku Pharmaceutical University
- Shokei Gakuin University
- Ishinomaki Senshu University

== Transportation ==
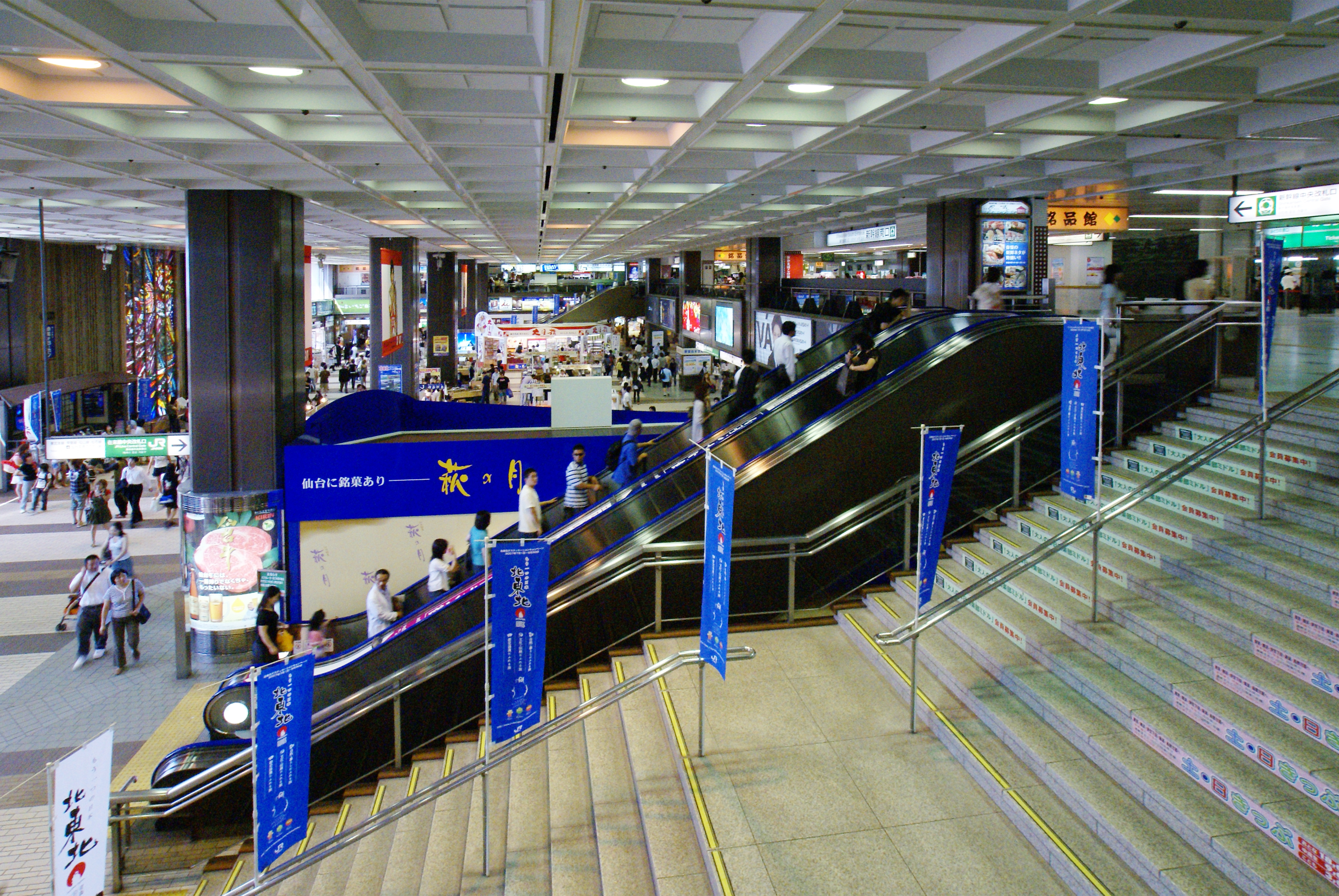
Sendai Station in August 2010

=== Rail ===
- JR East
  - Tōhoku Shinkansen
  - Tohoku Line
  - Jōban Line
  - Senseki Line
  - Senzan Line
  - Ishinomaki Line
  - Rikuu East Line
  - Kesennuma Line
  - Ōfunato Line
- Sendai Municipal Subway
  - Namboku Line
  - Tōzai Line
- Abukuma Express
- Sendai Airport Line

=== Roads ===
==== Expressways and toll roads ====
- Tōhoku Expressway
- Yamagata Expressway
- Sanriku Expressway
- Sendai-Hokubu Road
- Sendai-Nanbu Road
- Sendai-Tōbu Road

==== National highways ====
- National Route 4 (Nihonbashi of Tokyo–Kasukabe–Utsunomiya–Koriyama–Sendai–Furukawa–Ichinoseki–Morioka–Towada–Aomori)
- National Route 6 (Nihonbashi of Tokyo–Mito–Iwaki–Soma–Sendai)
- National Route 45 (Sendai–Ishinomaki–Ofunato–Kamaishi–Kuji–Hachinohe–Towada)
- National Route 47 (Furukawa–Narugo–Shinjyo–Sakata)
- National Route 48 (Sendai–Yamagata)
- National Route 108
- National Route 113
- National Route 286
- National Route 342
- National Route 346
- National Route 347
- National Route 349
- National Route 398
- National Route 399
- National Route 456
- National Route 457

=== Ports ===
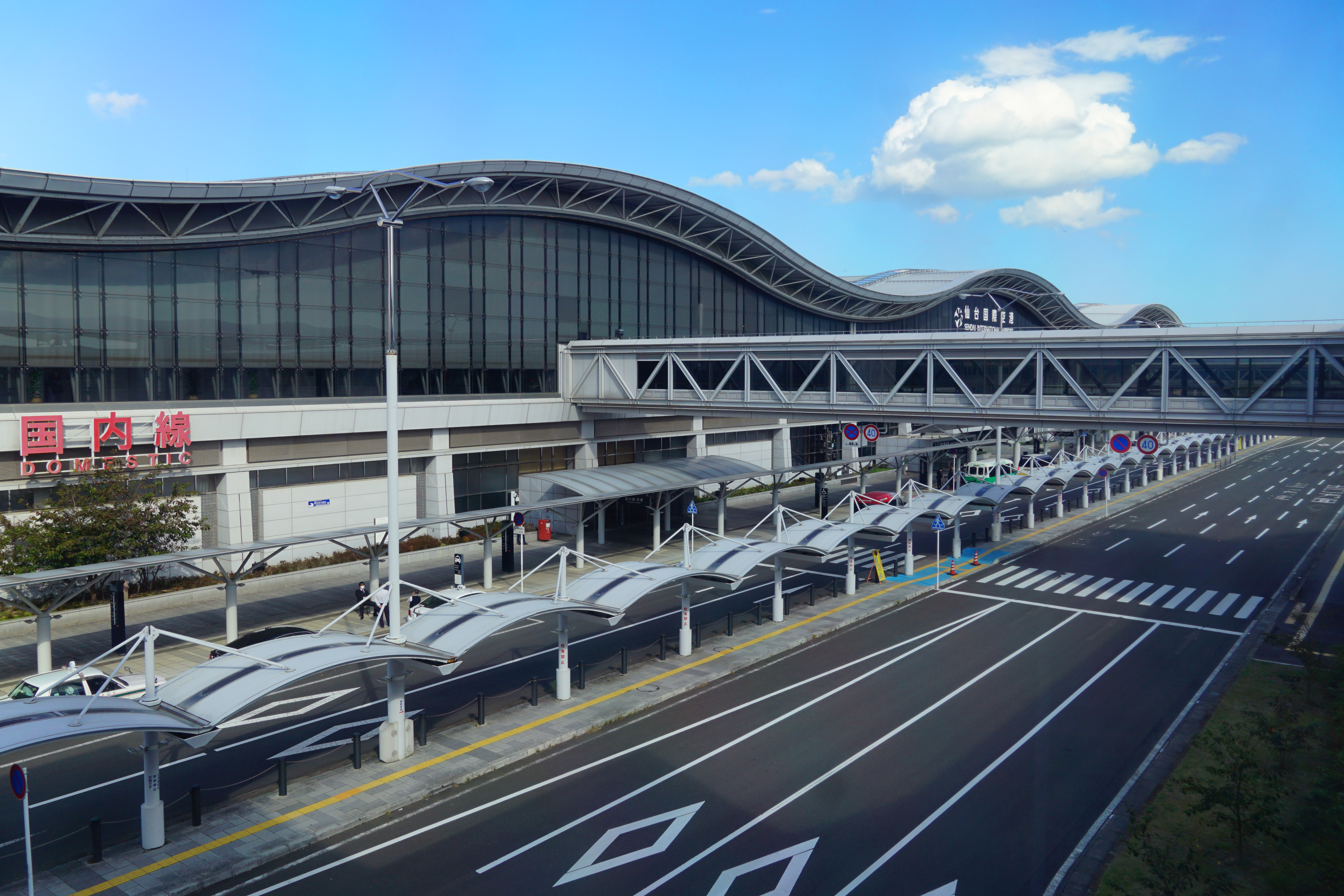
Sendai Airport

- Sendai Port – Ferry route to Tomakomai, Hokkaido and Nagoya, container hub port
- Ishinomaki Port – Ferry route to Mount Kinka and Tashiro Island.
- Matsushima Bay

=== Airports ===
- Sendai Airport

== Sports ==
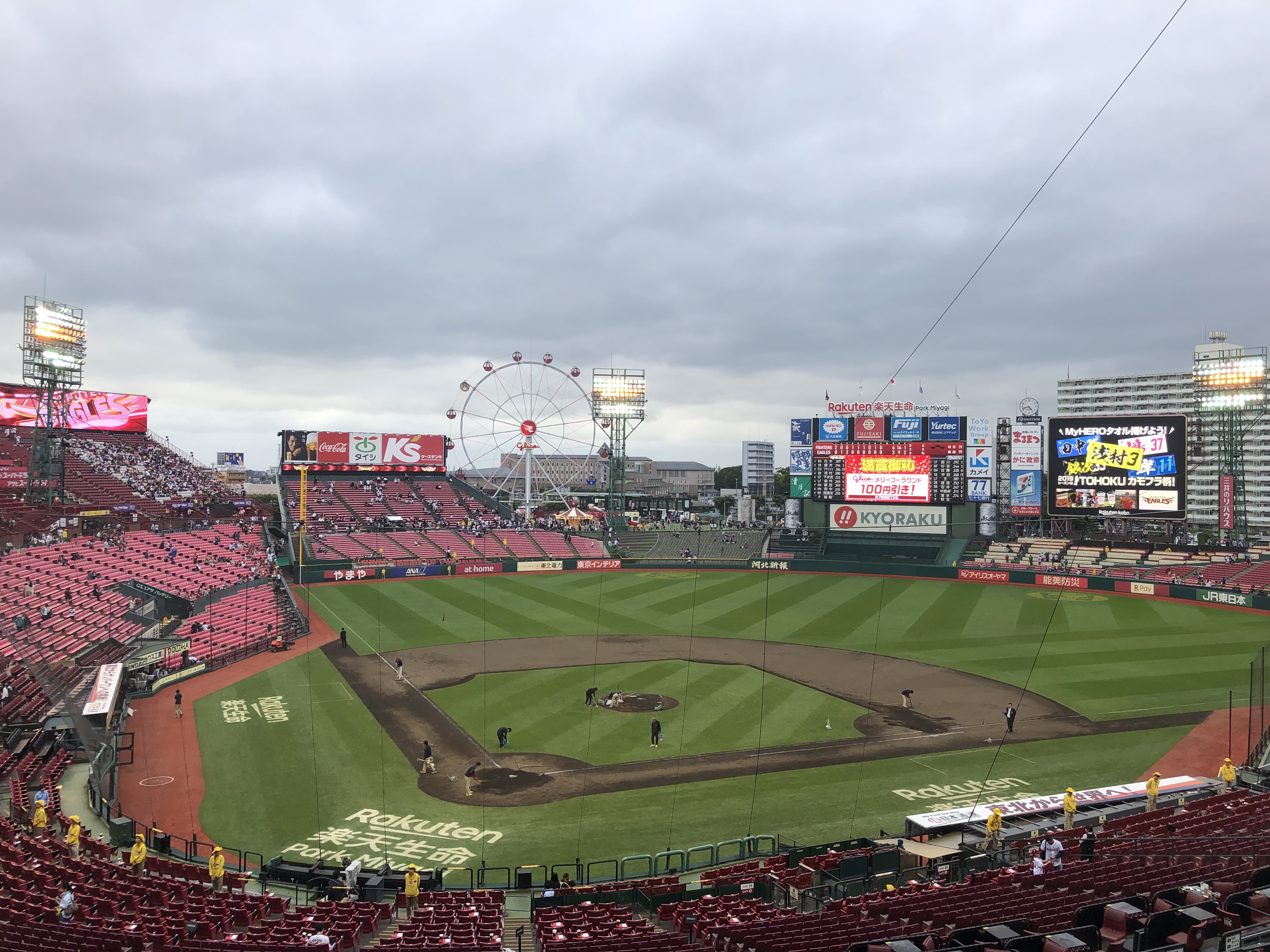
Rakuten Seimei Park Miyagi.

The sports teams listed below are based in Miyagi Prefecture.

- Baseball
  - Tohoku Rakuten Golden Eagles (Miyagi Baseball Stadium, Sendai)
  - Tohoku Reia
- Football (soccer)
  - Vegalta Sendai (Yurtec Stadium Sendai, Sendai)
  - Sony Sendai F.C. (Yurtec Stadium Sendai, Sendai)
  - Vegalta Sendai Ladies (Yurtec Stadium Sendai, Sendai)
- Basketball
  - Sendai 89ERS (Sendai Gymnasium, Sendai)
- Volleyball
  - Sendai Bellefille
- Futsal
  - Voscuore Sendai
- Professional wrestling
  - Sendai Girls' Pro Wrestling

Also, the Sendai Hi-Land Raceway hosts motorsport road races.

== Visitor attractions ==
Sendai was the castle town of the daimyō Date Masamune. The remains of Sendai Castle stand on a hill above the city.

Miyagi Prefecture boasts one of Japan's three greatest sights. Matsushima, the pine-clad islands, dot the waters off the coast of the prefecture.

The following are also noted as attractions:

- Aoba Castle
- Ichibanchō
- Akiu Hot Spring
- Iwai Point
- Kinkasan Islet
- Matsushima Bay
- Naruko Hot Spring
- Rikuchu Coast
- Okama Crater Lake
- Zao Botanical Garden
- Zao Hot Spring

== Famous festivals and events ==
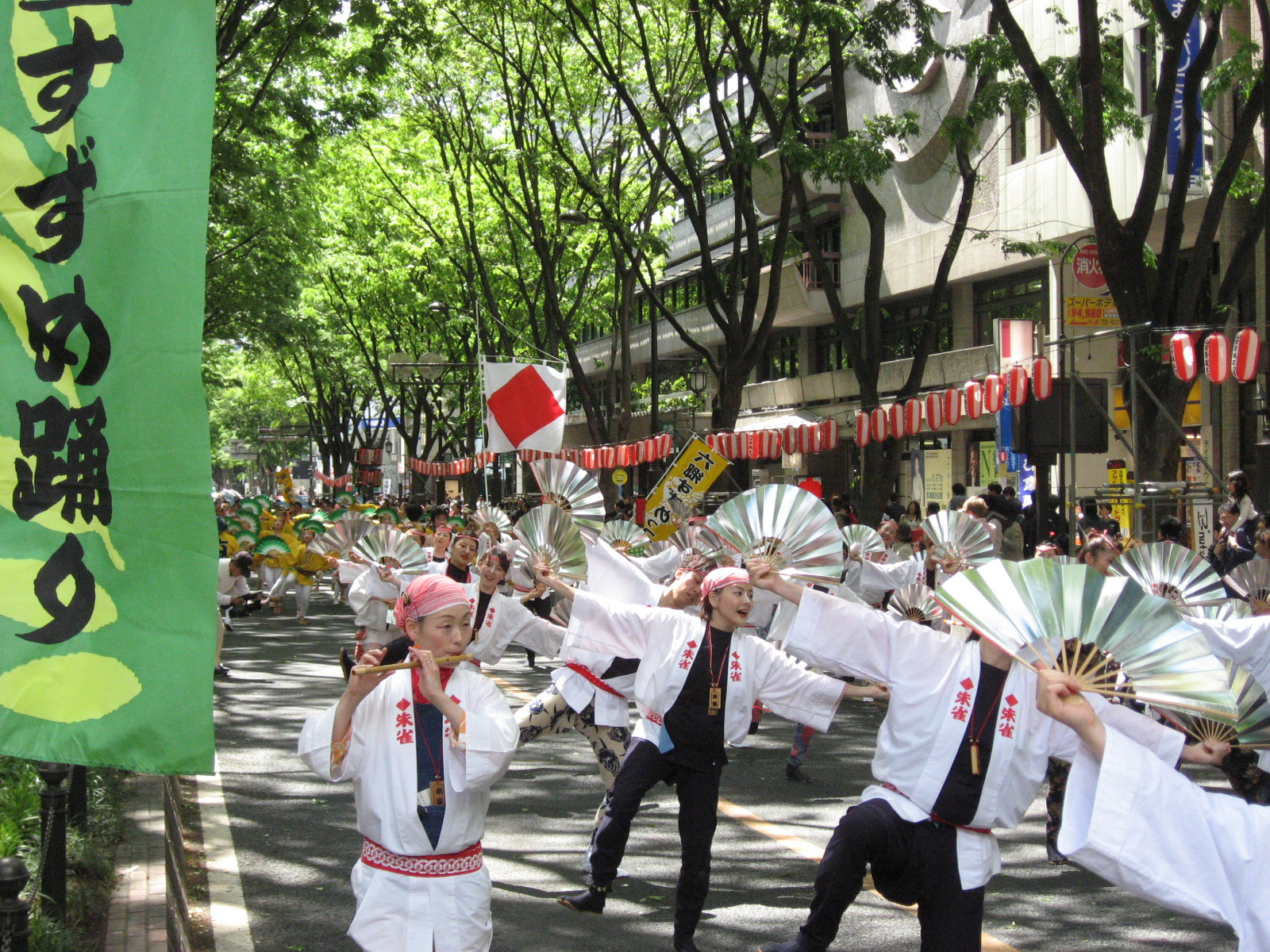
Suzume Dancing Event in Aoba Festival

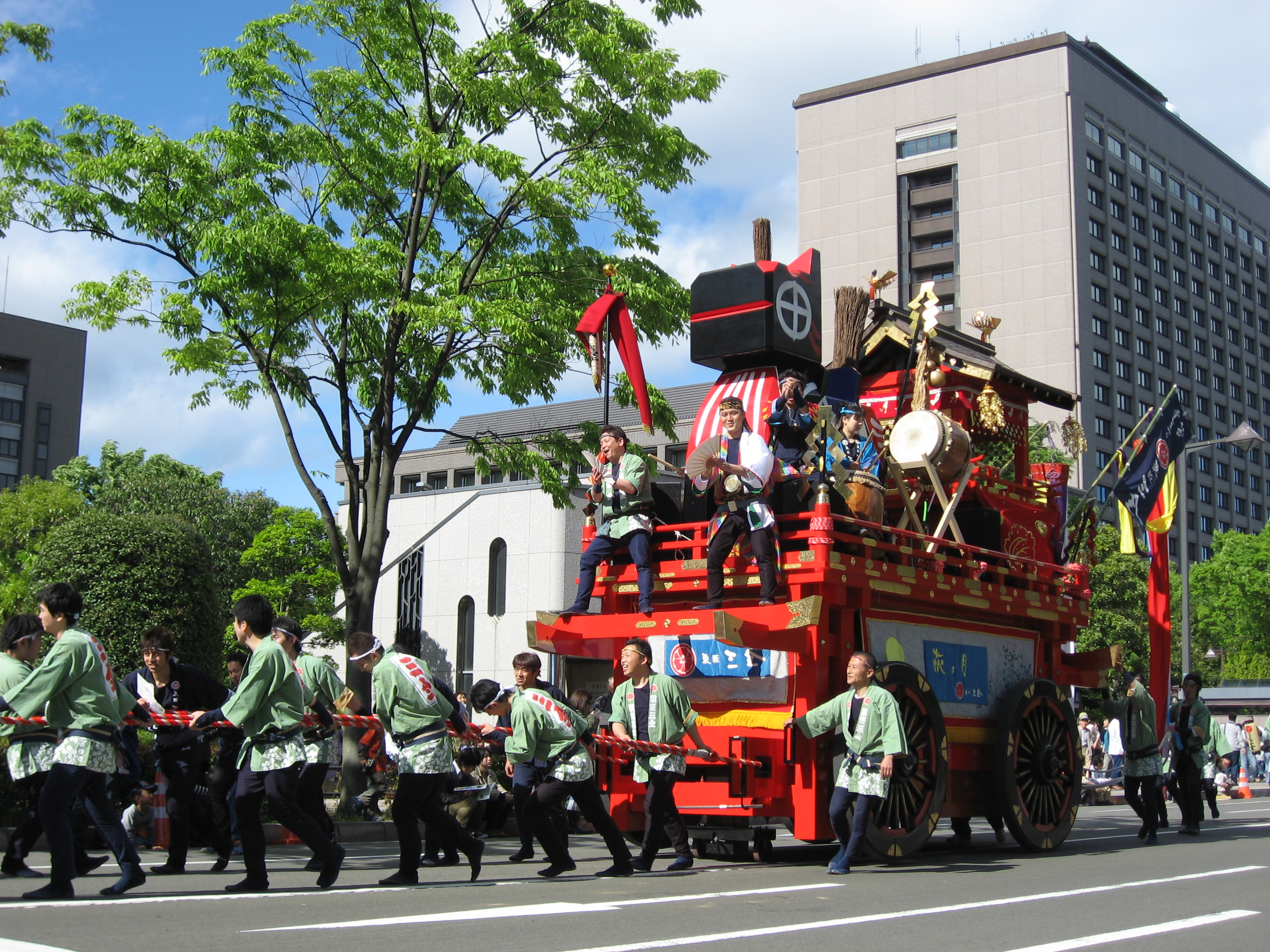
Aoba Festival of Sendai

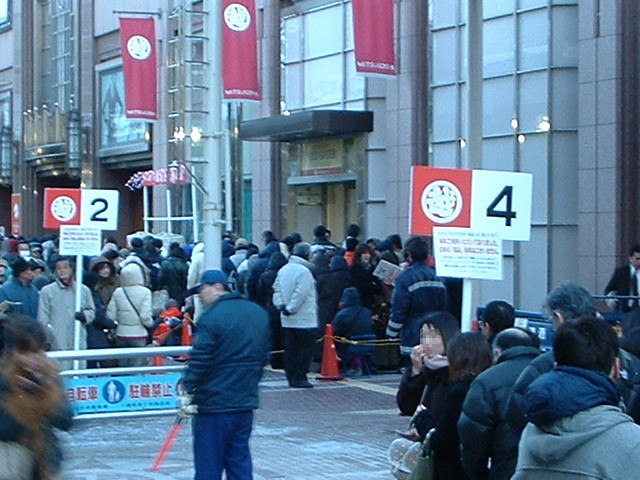
View of Traditional New Year's sale in Sendai

- Sendai New Year's traditional Sale on January 2
- Shiroishi Kokeshi Exhibition, May 3–5
- Aoba Festival, Suzume Odori traditional Japanese dance event in May
- Shiogama Port Festival in July
- Sendai Tanabata Festival, August 6–8
- Sendai Pageant of Starlight in December

== Popular culture ==
Miyagi Prefecture is one of the main settings of the manga and anime series Haikyū!!. The most well-known fictional schools located there are Karasuno High School, Aoba Johsai High School, Date Tech High and Shiratorizawa Academy, as well as Sendai City Gymnasium. Another anime series Wake Up, Girls! is also set in Miyagi Prefecture. The fictional town of Morioh, featured in JoJo's Bizarre Adventure: Diamond Is Unbreakable, and the reimagined Morioh Town in JoJolion, are inspired by locations in Miyagi Prefecture. Jujutsu Kaisen is also set in the Miyagi Prefecture, in the first episode of the adapted anime the camera pans across the sign "Miyagi Prefectural Sugisawa Third High School".
