= Kinkasan =

Island in Miyagi, Japan

Native name: Japanese: 金華山
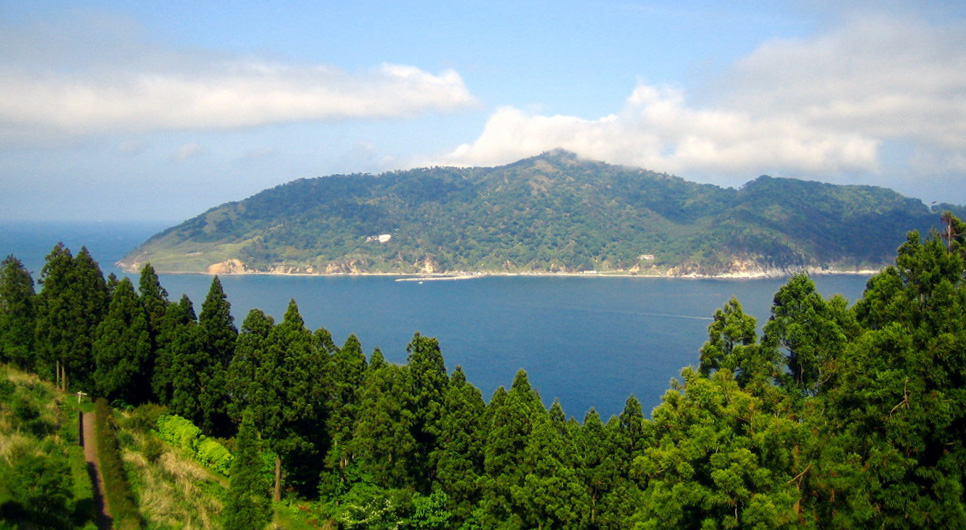
- View from Oshika Peninsula
- Interactive map of Kinkasan

Geography
- Location: Pacific Ocean
- Coordinates: 38°17′43″N 141°34′00″E
- Archipelago: Oshika
- Area: 10.28 km^{2} (3.97 sq mi)
- Coastline: 25 km (15.5 mi)
- Highest elevation: 445 m (1460 ft)
- Highest point: Kinkasan

Administration
- Japan
- Prefecture: Miyagi
- City: Ishinomaki

Demographics
- Population: 6 (2004)
- Ethnic groups: Japanese

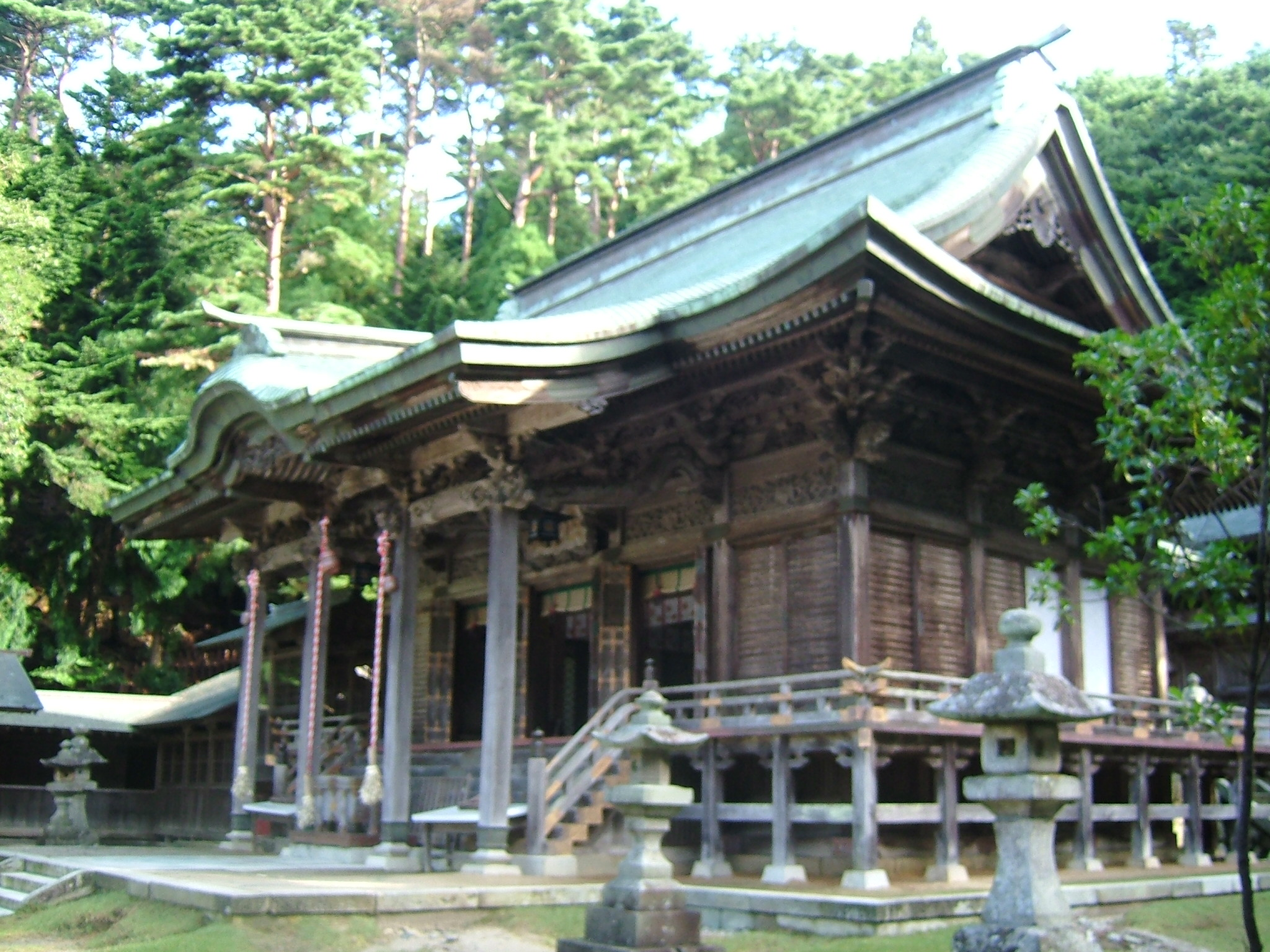
Koganeyama Shrine on Kinkasan Island, Miyagi Prefecture, Japan.

Kinkasan (金華山, Kinkasan; or Kinkazan) is a small island in Miyagi Prefecture in north-eastern Japan. It lies in the Pacific Ocean approximately one kilometer off the Oshika Peninsula.

== Geography ==
Kinkasan is 9.5 km^{2} (3.7 mi^{2}) in area, and its highest point is the pyramid-shaped Mount Kinka, which stands at 445 m (1,460 ft).

It can be reached by ferry from Ishinomaki.

== History ==
There is a shrine on the island, called Koganeyama-jinja, which dates from the 8th century.
