= World Network of Biosphere Reserves in Asia and the Pacific =

Biosphere reserves are areas comprising terrestrial, marine and coastal ecosystems. Under UNESCO's Man and Biosphere Reserve Programme, there are 142 biosphere reserves recognized as part of the World Network of Biosphere Reserves in Asia and the Pacific as of April 2016. These are distributed across 24 countries in the region.

== The list ==
Below is the list of biosphere reserves in Asia and the Pacific, organized by country/territory, along with the year these were designated as part of the World Network of Biosphere Reserves.

=== Australia ===
- Fitzgerald River, Western Australia (1978)
- Mornington Peninsula and Western Port, Victoria (2002)
- Noosa, Queensland (2007)
- Great Sandy, Queensland (2009)
- Sunshine Coast, Queensland (2022)

=== Cambodia ===
- Tonlé Sap (1997)

=== China ===
- Changbaishan (1979)
- Dinghushan, Guangdong (1979)
- Wolong, Sichuan (1979)
- Fanjingshan, Guizhou (1986)
- Xilin Gol, Inner Mongolia (1987)
- Wuyishan, Jiangxi and Fujian (1987)
- Bogeda, Xinjiang (1990)
- Shennongjia, Hubei (1990)
- Yancheng, Jiangsu (1992)
- Xishuangbanna, Yunnan (1993)
- Maolan, Guizhou (1996)
- Tianmushan, Zhejiang (1996)
- Fenglin (1997)
- Jiuzhaigou Valley, Sichuan (1997)
- Nanji Islands, Zhejiang (1998)
- Shankou Mangrove, Guangxi (2000)
- Baishuijiang, Gansu (2000)
- Gaoligong Mountain, Yunnan (2000)
- Huanglong, Sichuan (2000)
- Baotianman, Henan (2001)
- Saihan Wula, Inner Mongolia (2001)
- Dalai Lake, Inner Mongolia (2002)
- Wudalianchi, Heilongjiang (2003)
- Yading, Sichuan (2003)
- Foping, Shaanxi (2004)
- Qomolangma, Tibet (2004)
- Chebaling, Guangdong (2007)
- Xingkai Lake, Heilongjiang (2007)
- Mao'er Mountain, Guangxi (2011)
- Jinggangshan, Jiangxi (2012)
- Niubeiliang, Shaanxi (2012)
- Snake Island, Laotie Mountain (2013)
- Hanma, Inner Mongolia (2015)
- Mount Huangshan, Anhui (2018)
- Daqingshan, Inner Mongolia (2025)
- Zhouzhi, Shaanxi (2025)

=== Federated States of Micronesia ===
- Utwe (2005)
- And Atoll (2007)

=== India ===
- Nilgiri (Karnataka, Kerala & Tamil Nadu) (1986)
- Gulf of Mannar (1989)
- Sunderbans (1989)
- Nanda Devi (1988)
- Nokrek (1988)
- Pachmarhi (1999)#MP
- Simlipal (1994)
- Achanakmar-Amarkantak (2005)
- Great Nicobar (1989)
- Agasthyamala (2005)
- Khangchendzonga (2018) ( Sikkim)
- Panna (2020)
- Cold Desert (2025) (Himachal Pradesh)

=== Indonesia ===
- Cibodas, including Mount Gede Pangrango National Park (1977)
- Komodo (1977)
- Lore Lindu (1977)
- Tanjung Puting (1977)
- Mount Leuser National Park (1981)
- Siberut (1981)
- Giam Siak Kecil-Bukit Batu (2009)
- Wakatobi (2012)
- Bromo Tengger Semeru, including Arjuno-Welirang (2015)
- Taka Bonerate-Kepulauan Selayar (2015)
- Alas Purwo (2016)
- Berbak-Sembilang (2018)
- Betung Kerihun-Lake Sentarum (2018)
- Mount Rinjani National Park (2018)
- Saleh-Moyo-Tambora (2019)
- Togean Tojo Una-Una (2019)

=== Iran ===
- Arasbaran (1976)
- Arjan and Parishan (1976)
- Geno (1976)
- Golestan (1976)
- Hara (1976)
- Kavir (1976)
- Lake Urmia (1976)
- Miankaleh (1976)
- Touran (1976)
- Dena (2010)
- Tang-e-Sayad & Sabzkuh (2015)
- Hamoun (2016)
- Dalankuh – Qamishlou (2026)

=== Japan ===
- Mount Hakusan (1980)
- Mount Ōdaigahara & Mount Ōmine (1980)
- Shiga Highland (1980)
- Yakushima Island (1980)
- Aya (2012)
- Minami-Alps (2014)
- Sobo, Katamuki and Okue (2017)
- Minakami (2017)

=== Kazakhstan ===
- Korgalzhyn (2012)
- Alakol (2013)
- Akzhayik (2014)
- Katon-Karagay (2014)
- Aksu-Zhabagly (2015)
- Barsakelmes (2016)
- Altyn-Emel (2017)
- Karatau (2017)

=== Kyrgyzstan ===
- Sary-Chelek (1978)
- Issyk Kul (2001)

=== Malaysia ===
- Tasik Chini (2009)
- Crocker Range (2014)
- Penang Hill (2021)

=== Maldives ===
- Baa Atoll 2011

=== Mongolia ===
- Great Gobi (1990)
- Bogd Khan Mountain (1996)
- Ubsunur Hollow Biosphere Reserve (1997)
- Khustain Nuruu National Park (2002)
- Dornod Mongol (2005)
- Mongol Daguur (2007)
- Tost, Toson Bumbiin Nuruu (2026)

=== Myanmar ===
- Inlay Lake (2015)
- Indawgyi Lake (2017)

=== North Korea ===
- Mount Paekdu (1989)
- Mount Kuwol (2004)
- Mount Myohyang (2009)
- Mount Chilbo (2014)

=== Pakistan ===
- Lal Suhanra National Park (1977)
- Ziarat Juniper Forest (2013)
- Gallies (2023)
- Garam Chashma Chitral (2023)

=== Palau ===
- Ngaremeduu (2005)

=== Philippines ===
- Puerto Galera (1977)
- Palawan (1990)
- Albay (March 2016)
- Matibay na Bayan ng Sablayan (2026)

=== South Korea ===
- Mount Sorak (1982)
- Jeju Island (2002)
- Shinan Dadohae (Sinan Dadohae Biosphere Reserve) (2009)
- Gwangneung Forest (Korea National Arboretum) (2010)
- Gochang (2013)
- Suncheon (2018)
- Gangwon Eco-peace (Korean Demilitarized Zone-near areas across five counties of Gangwon Province) (2019)
- Yeoncheon Imjin River (2020)

=== Sri Lanka ===
- Hurulu (1977)
- Sinharaja (1978)
- Kanneliya-Dediyagala-Nakiyadeniya (KDN) (2004)
- Bundala (2005)

=== Thailand ===
- Sakaerat (1976)
- Hauy Tak Teak (1977)
- Mae Sa-Kog Ma (1977)
- Ranong (1997)
- Doi Luang Chiang Dao (2021)

=== Timor-Leste ===
- Nino Konis Santana (2026)

=== Turkmenistan ===
- Repetek (1978)

=== Uzbekistan ===
- Mount Chatkal (1978)

=== Vietnam ===
- Cần Giờ Mangrove Forest (2000)
- Cát Tiên National Park (2001)
- Cát Bà Island (2004)
- Red River Delta (2004)
- Kien Giang (2006)
- Western Nghệ An (2007)
- Cape Cà Mau National Park (2009)
- Chàm Islands – Hội An (2009)
- Langbiang (2015)
- Núi Chúa National Park (2021)
- Kon Hà Nừng Highlands (2021)
- Phong Nha – Ke Bang (2026)
