= Futagojima islets =

Small Japanese islets

Coordinates: 38°37′00″N 141°31′59″E

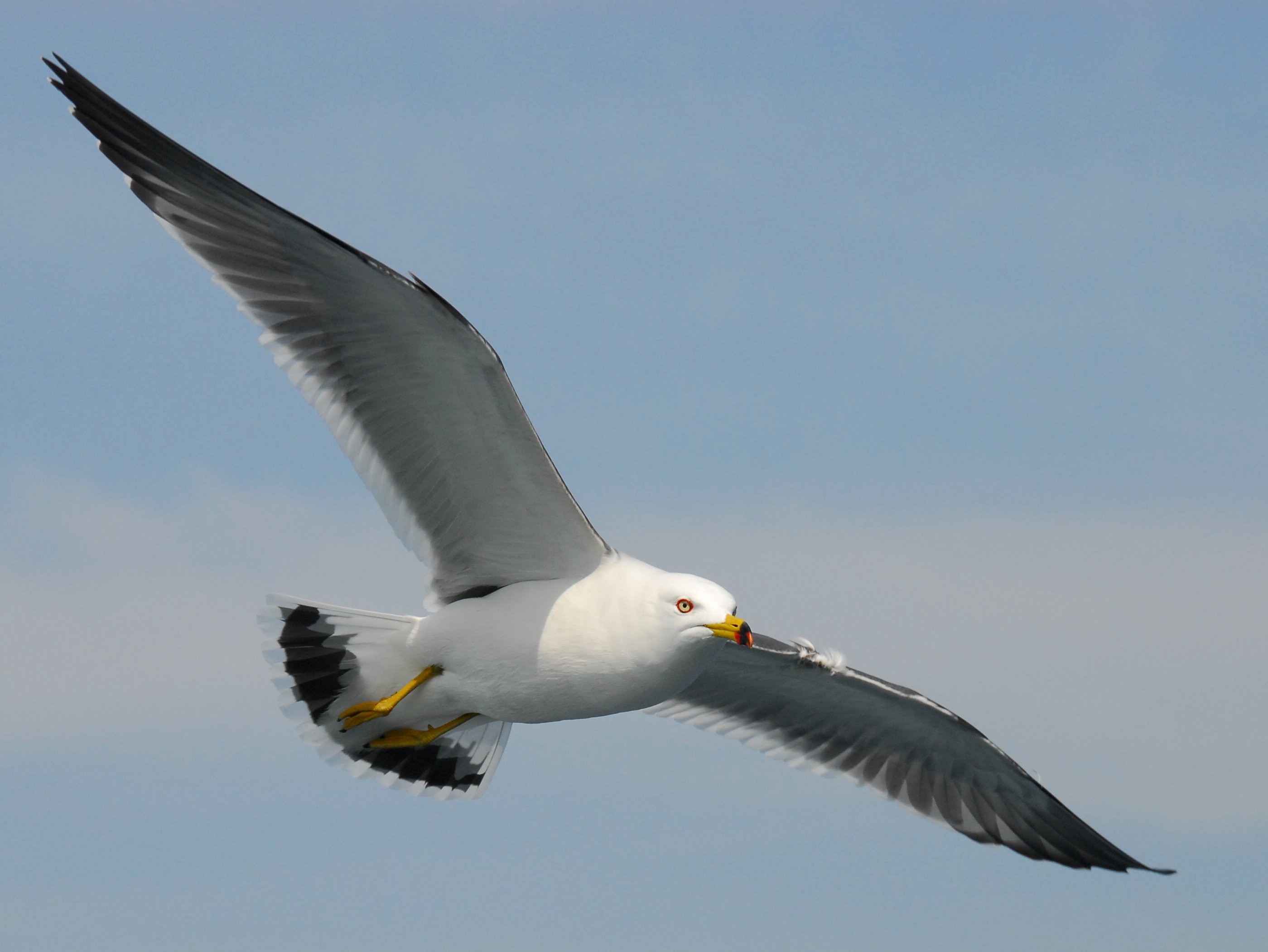
Black-tailed gulls breed on the islets

The Futagojima islets comprise a group of rocky islets and reefs lying about 700 m off the coast of Kitakamicho in Miyagi Prefecture, Japan. They have been recognised as an Important Bird Area (IBA) by BirdLife International because they support a population of black-tailed gulls.
