= Dadohaehaesang National Park =

National park in South Korea

- 다도해해상국립공원, 多島海海上國立公園
- IUCN category II (national park)
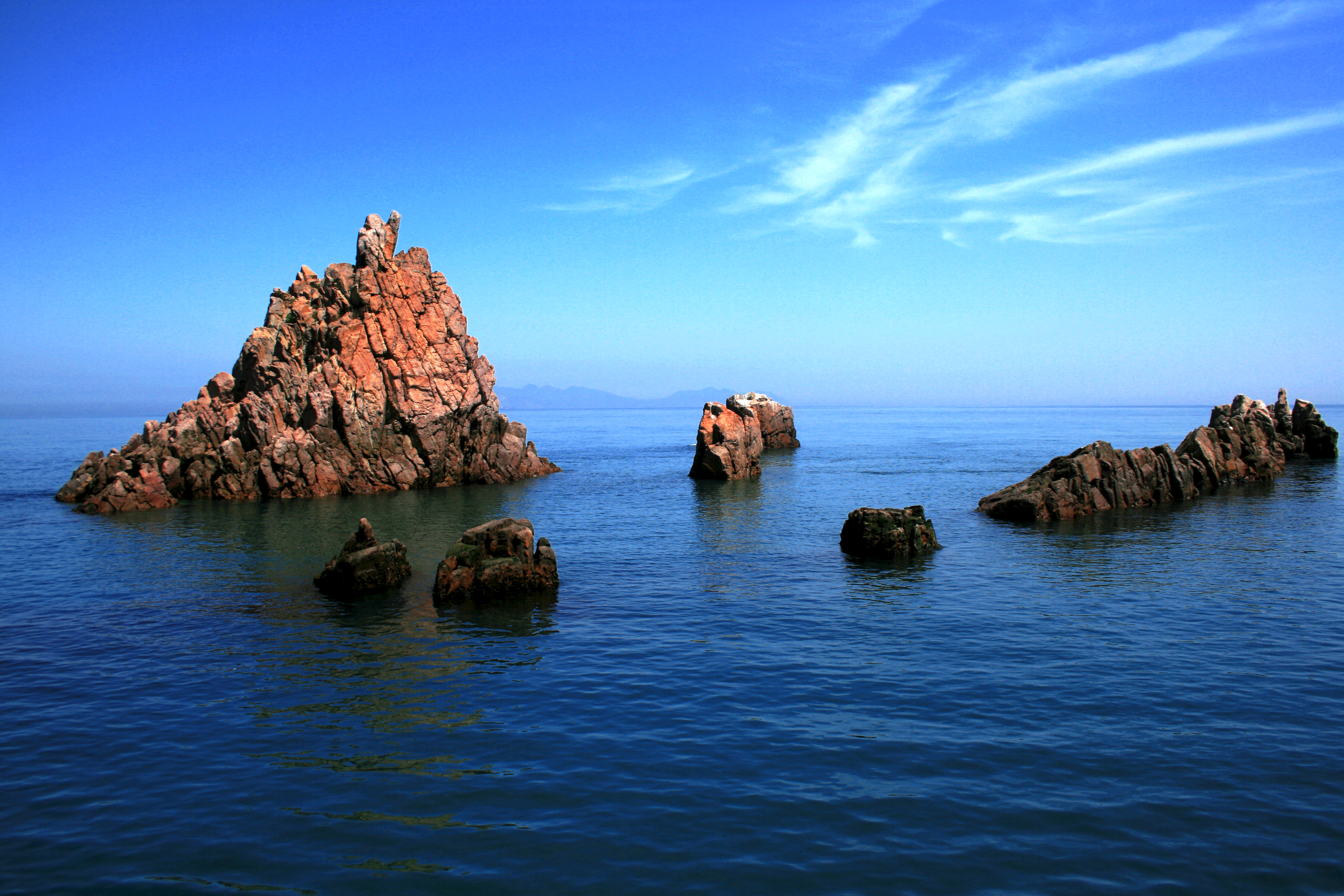
- Hongdo Island, located in the park
- Interactive map of Dadohaehaesang National Park
- Coordinates: 34.191°N 126.7°E
- Area: 2,321.5 km^{2} (896.3 sq mi)
- Established: 23 December 1981
- Visitors: 560,000
- Governing body: Korea National Park Service
- Website: knps.or.kr

The twenty-two national parks of South Korea.
Land-based parks are in red and marine parks are in blue.

Dadohaehaesang National Park (Korean: 다도해해상국립공원; Hanja: 多島海海上國立公園) was designated in 1981 as the largest national park in South Korea. The total area is 2,321.5 km^{2} (896.3 sq mi) with 1,986.6 km^{2} (767.0 sq mi) being marine area and 334.8 km^{2} (129.3 sq mi) being land area. Main attractions of Dadohaehaesang National Park are Hongdo, Heuksando and Baekdo. In terms of biodiversity, 1,541 plant species, more than 11 mammal species including even orca or killer whales, 147 bird species, 885 insect species, 13 amphibious reptile species, 154 ocean water fish species, and 11 freshwater fish species have inhabited in this area.

== See also ==
- Sinan Dadohae Biosphere Reserve
