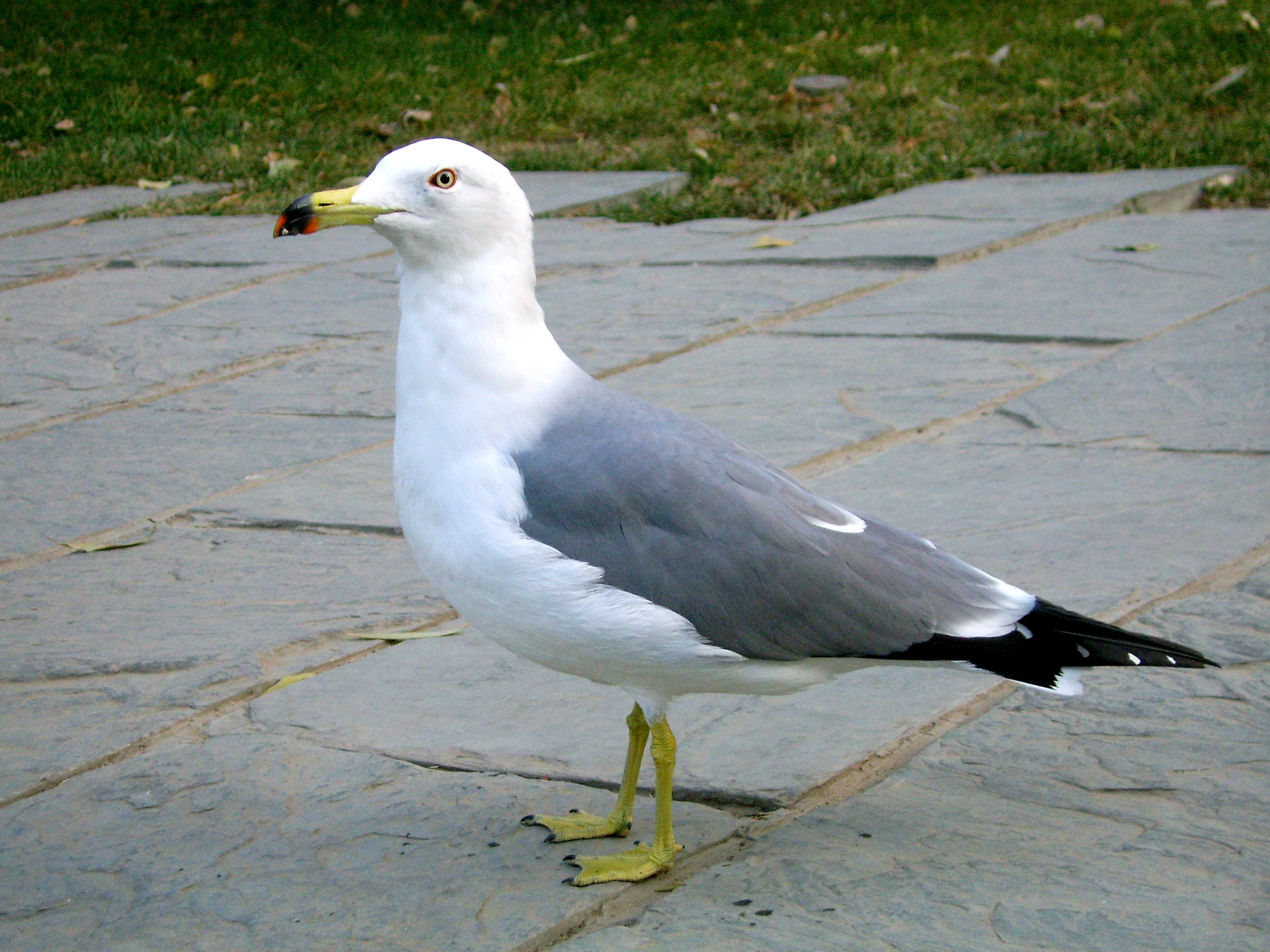

Conservation status
- Least Concern (IUCN 3.1)

Scientific classification
- Kingdom: Animalia
- Phylum: Chordata
- Class: Aves
- Order: Charadriiformes
- Family: Laridae
- Genus: Larus
- Species: L. crassirostris

Binomial name
- Larus crassirostris Vieillot, 1818

= Black-tailed gull =

Species of bird

The black-tailed gull (Larus crassirostris) is a gull native to shorelines of East Asia.

== Description ==
The black-tailed gull is medium-sized (46 cm or 18.1 in), with a wingspan of 126–128 cm (49.6–50.4 in). It has yellow legs and a red and black spot at the end of the bill. Males and females have identical plumage and features, although males are larger in size than females. This gull takes four years to reach full adult plumage. As the name suggests, it has a black tail. The bird has a cat-like call, giving it its Japanese name — umineko (海猫, 'sea cat'), and Korean name — gwaeng-yi gull, which means 'cat' gull. In Hachinohe their calls are one of the 100 Soundscapes of Japan.

== Distribution and habitat ==
The species is resident to coastlines of the East China Sea, Japan, Manchuria and the Kuril Islands. It is a vagrant to Alaska and North America and has been found in the Philippines.

=== In Japan ===
The bird is common in Japan, nesting from Hokkaido to Western Kyushu. It has caused flights to be delayed at Haneda Airport in Tokyo.

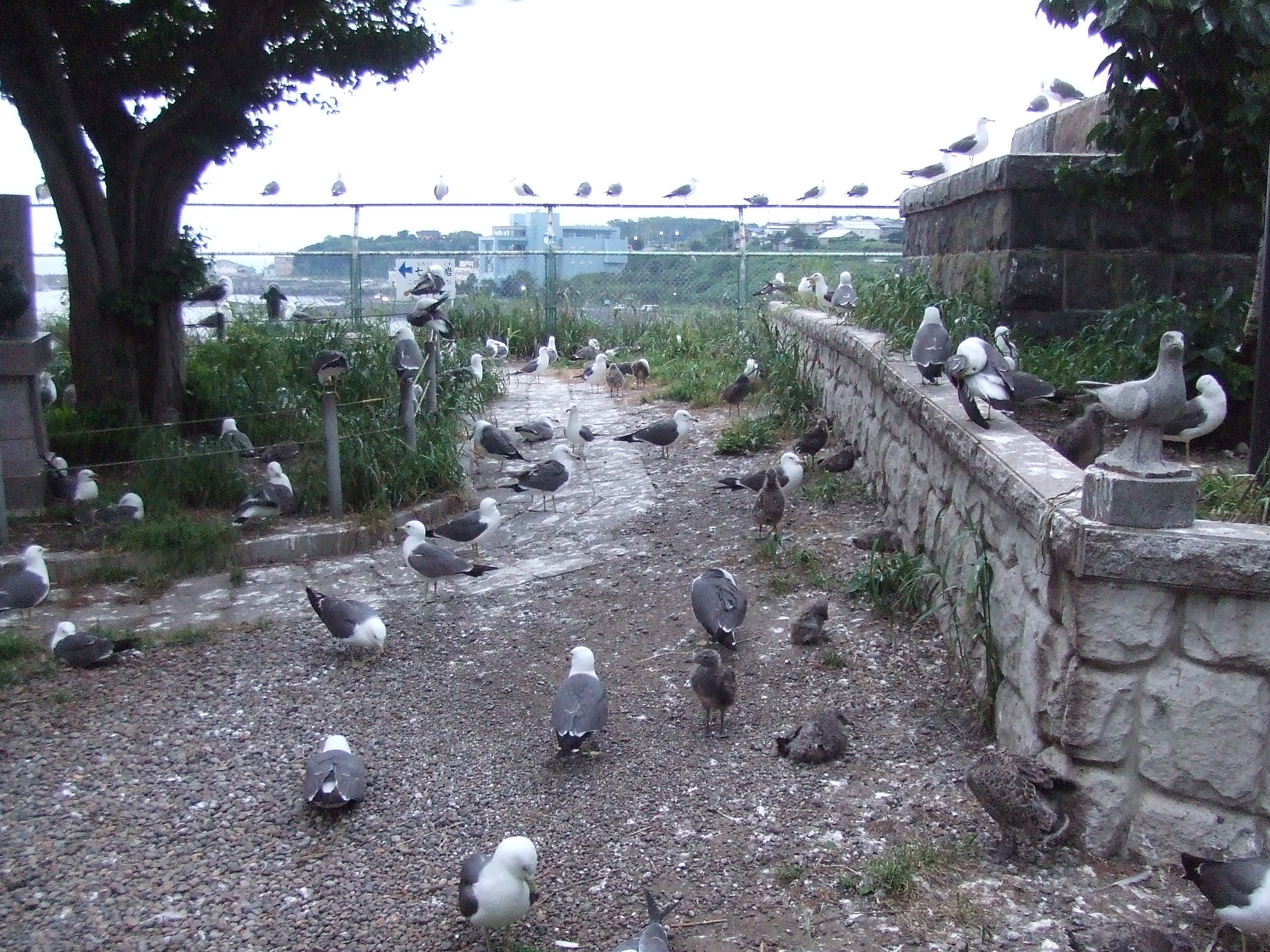
The gulls at Kabushima

An enormous gathering of black-tailed gulls can be found at Kabushima, a peninsula (formerly an island) in Hachinohe, Aomori, Japan. A Shinto shrine was raised by fishermen in 1269 (and has been rebuilt several times since) at which the black-tailed gull is seen as a messenger of the goddess of the fishery. For over 700 years, the species has enjoyed reverence, feeding and protection from the local population. As a result, every summer, over 40,000 black-tailed gulls nest and raise their young in the grounds of the shrine and the surrounding island, which has been designated a National Natural Monument by the government of Japan. The gulls are very tame and are a popular tourist attraction.

Around 5,000 birds also nest at Fumi-shima in Shimane Prefecture near Izumo Shrine, and there is a large colony at Teuri Island in Hokkaido.

=== In Korea ===
The species is common on the shoreline of Korea and on various islands. There are over 20,000 black-tailed gulls on Liancourt Rocks, and numbers are increasing due to the absence of predators. In 2008, the bird was officially chosen as one of the mascots of Liancourt Rocks. Nando and Hongdo islands, both Korean natural monuments as of 1982, are also known breeding grounds.

=== In North America ===
A rare visitor to the United States, a black-tailed gull was spotted from Burlington, Vermont, in October 2005. The species has been spotted in Illinois several times.

== Ecology ==
The black-tailed gull feeds mainly on small fish, molluscs, crustaceans scraps and carrion. A study analyzing the identifiable parts of gull excreta in Korea found that 19.1% consisted of the remains of fish, 3.3% of crustaceans, and 3.3% of land insects.

The species often follows ships and commercial fishing fleets. It also steals food from other seabirds. It is a colonial nester, with colonies forming in mid-April. 2–3 eggs are laid by early June. Incubation lasts approximately 24 days.

Black-tailed gulls use a variety of voice signals and are known to use more than 10 different sounds for communication. Young can recognize their parents from their voice and visual stimulation between 10 and 15 days after hatching, and can also distinguish between siblings and non-siblings. Alarm calls are alert signals that warn of predators or danger. Aggressive calls accompany attacks on predators. Contact calls are signals used for intra-specific communication. The most commonly heard cat-like sound ("mew call") is a part of the contact call, and is frequently used, such as when returning to the nest after taking food, alternating the role of the mating and nesting, taking care of the young, collective flight, etc. The sound of a young gull begging for food and the sound of a female during mating are also included in the contact call.

== Images ==
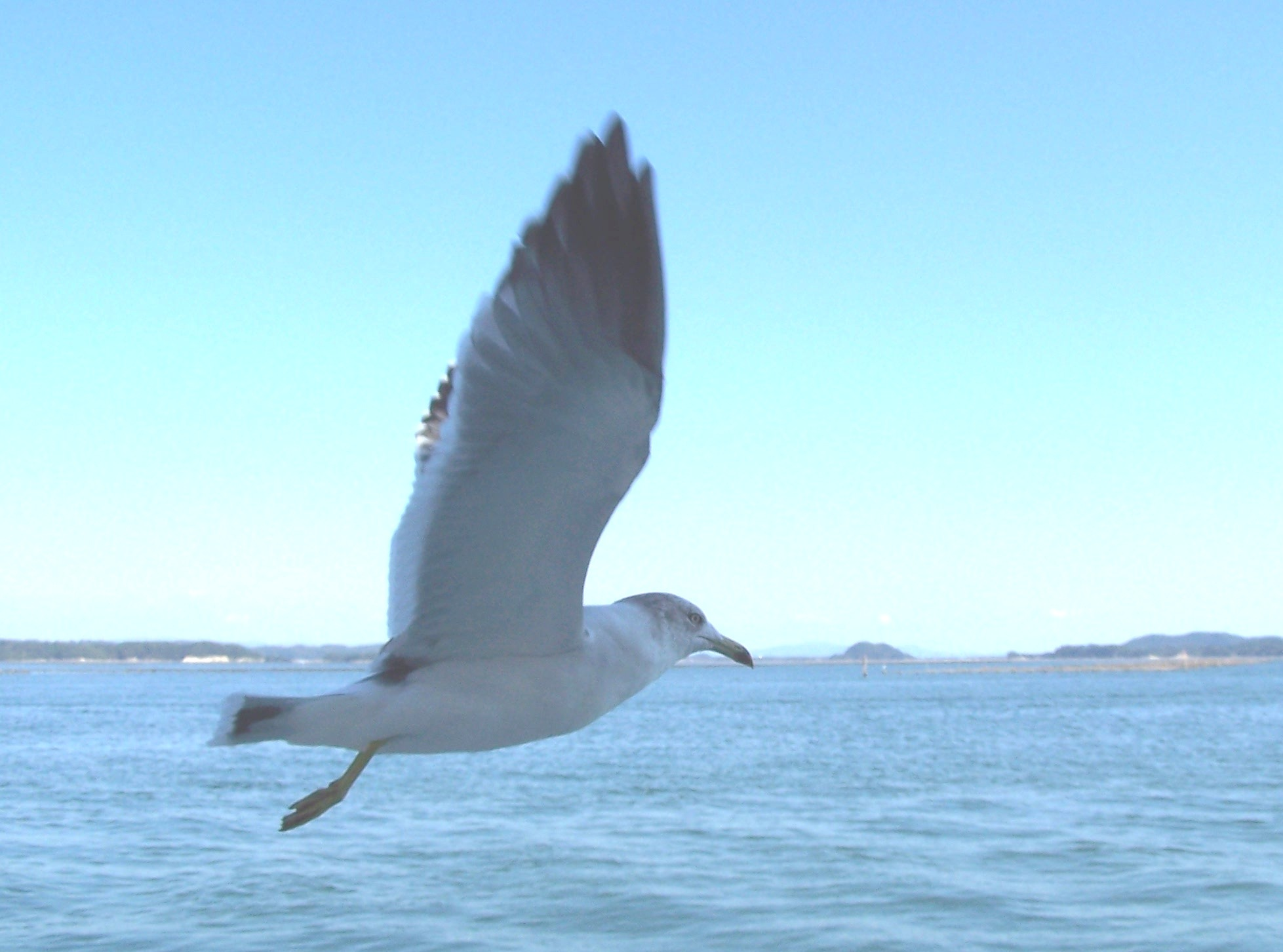
Black-tailed Gull, immature plumage

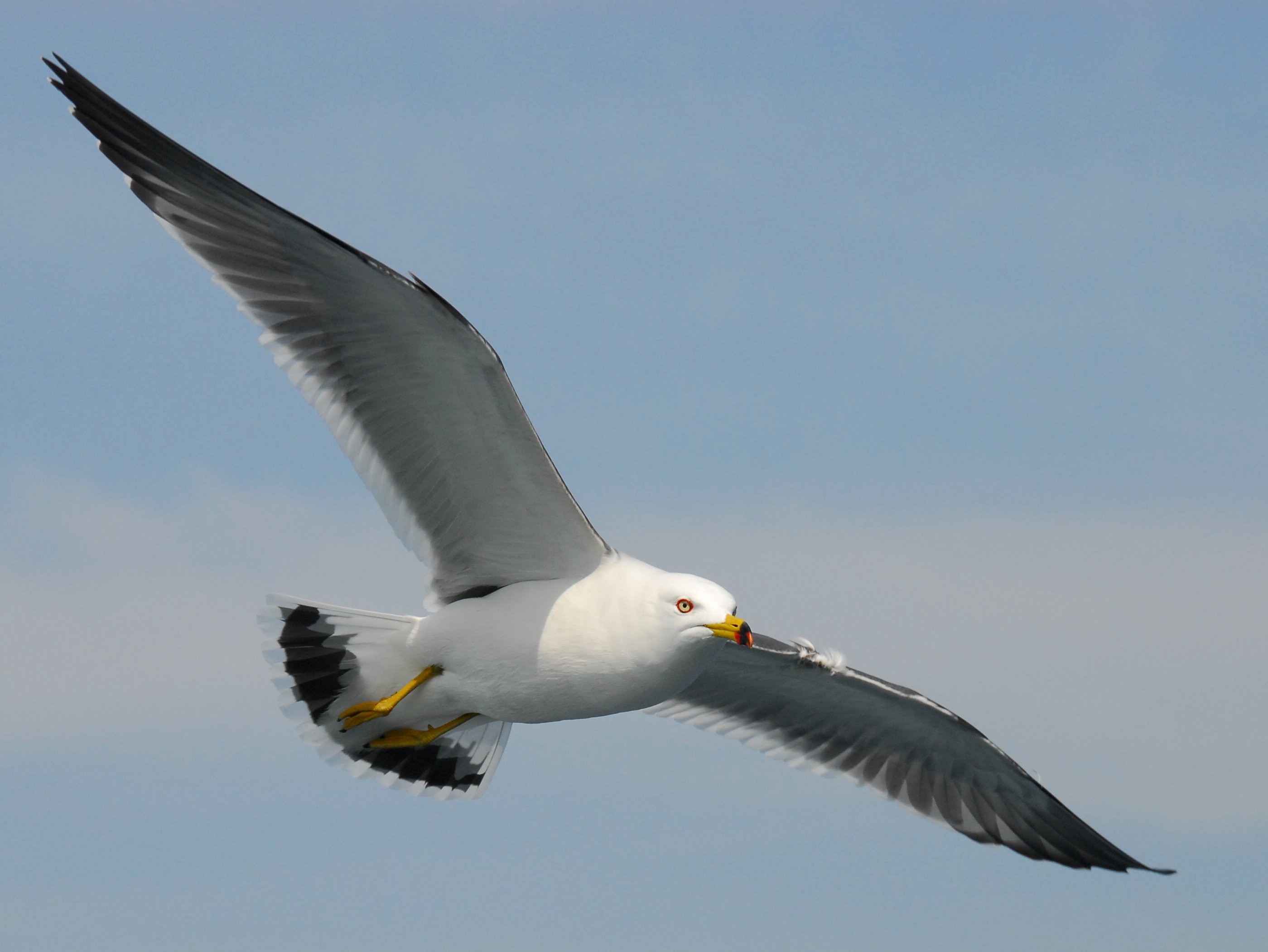
Black-tailed Gull in Tokyo Bay

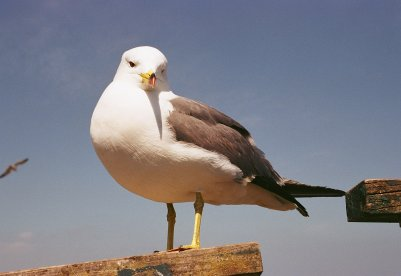
Black-tailed Gull in Hachinohe, Aomori

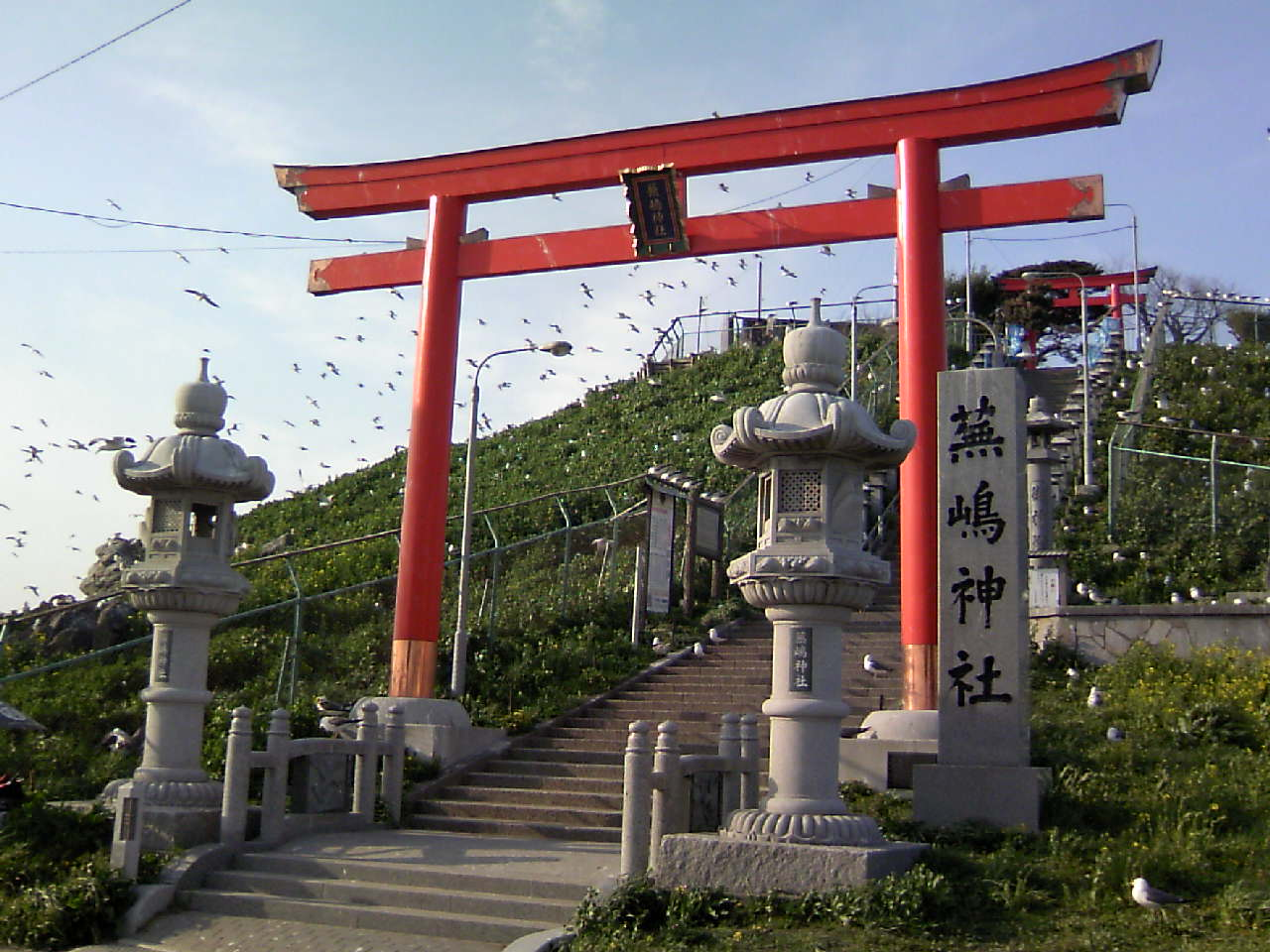
Black-tailed Gulls at entrance to Kabushima Shrine
