= And Atoll (biosphere reserve) =

Biosphere reserve in the Federated States of Micronesia

Coordinates: 6°46′58.800″N 157°57′10.800″E

And Atoll Biosphere Reserve is a Biosphere reserve located in the Federated States of Micronesia (FSM). It was declared in 2007 and covers on area of 950 hectares (2,300 acres) on land and waters associated with the Ant Atoll.

== UNESCO description ==
And Atoll is biologically and topographically representative of a vast majority of the atolls around Federated States of Micronesia (FSM). It is the most biologically diverse and undisturbed atoll in Pohnpei, Pohnpei's number one marine Area of Biological Significance (ABS) and one of the identified 24 “Priority Action Areas” in the Eco-regional Plan under the National Biodiversity Strategic Action Plan (NBSAP).

== Key information ==
- Declaration Date: 2007
- Surface Area: 950 ha
- Administrative Division: And Biosphere Reserve ABR committee

== Ecological characteristics ==
And Atoll is biologically and topographically representative of a vast majority of the atolls around Federated States of Micronesia (FSM).

It is the most biologically diverse and undisturbed atoll in Pohnpei, Pohnpei's number one marine Area of Biological Significance (ABS) and one of the identified 24 “Priority Action Areas” in the Eco-regional Plan under the National Biodiversity Strategic Action Plan (NBSAP).

With a significant lagoon area of approximately 74 square kilometres (29 sq mi), the atoll, which is located 18.5 km south west of Pohnpei, is home to 13 species of reptiles, including the green turtle (Chelonia mydas) and hawksbill turtle (Eretmochelys imbricata), 25 bird species, seven mammals, and hundreds of other marine species.

The proposal to make a Biosphere Reserve presents an opportunity to create a model of sustainability. The relationship between the dynamic human economic system and the larger dynamic, but slower changing, ecological system, can support prosperous local initiatives indefinitely.

Done within the bounds of the atoll environment, as to not destroy the diversity, complexity and function of the ecological system, And atoll can stand as an example to the many other islands and atolls of Micronesia and the Pacific. And Atoll consists of thirteen low-lying, forested islets encircling a 75 square kilometres (29 sq mi) lagoon.

== Human activities ==
Capacity building, fishery/fisheries, forestry, hunting, local participation, recreation, tourism.

There is a very small permanent, part-time population of caretakers on the island itself; therefore there is a very small human ecological footprint on the atoll.

However, there is a more significant population within the transition zone on the southwestern coast of Pohnpei Island.

== See also ==
- World Network of Biosphere Reserves in Asia and the Pacific
- Utwe
