= Kabushima Shrine =

Shinto shrine in Hachinohe, Japan

Kabushima Shrine 蕪島神社
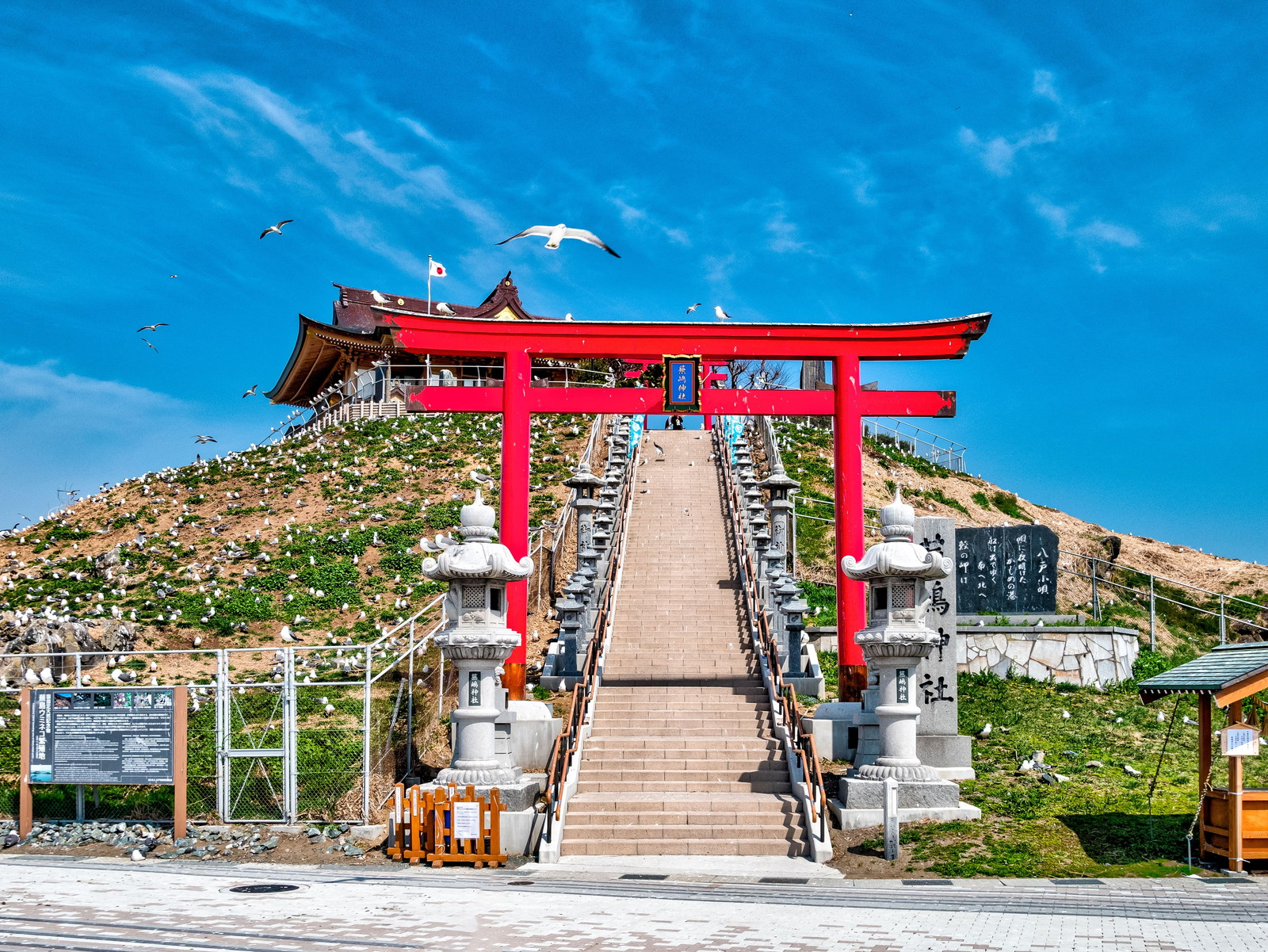

- Location within Aomori Prefecture Location within Japan

Religion
- Affiliation: Shinto

Location
- Coordinates: 40.5386°N 141.5576°E

Website
- kabushimajinja.com

Kabushima Shrine (蕪島 神社, Kabushima Jinja), located in Hachinohe, Aomori, is a Shinto shrine in Japan. It was first built in 1269 on top of the Kabushima island by fishermen to pray for safety and good harvest at sea. The shrine has been rebuilt several times throughout its history. It was burnt down in November 2015 and rebuilt in 2020.

== Black-tailed gulls ==
The shrine is linked with the black-tailed gull (海猫, umineko; lit. 'sea cat' in Japanese) found in great numbers on the island between March and August as the island is their nesting ground. The gulls are associated with the Buddhist goddess Benzaiten, whose image is found within the shrine. The droppings of the gulls falling on people is considered good luck and people may go to the shrine to receive a commemorative tablet should it happen, although umbrellas are provided at the location for visitors who need them for shelter.

== Gallery ==
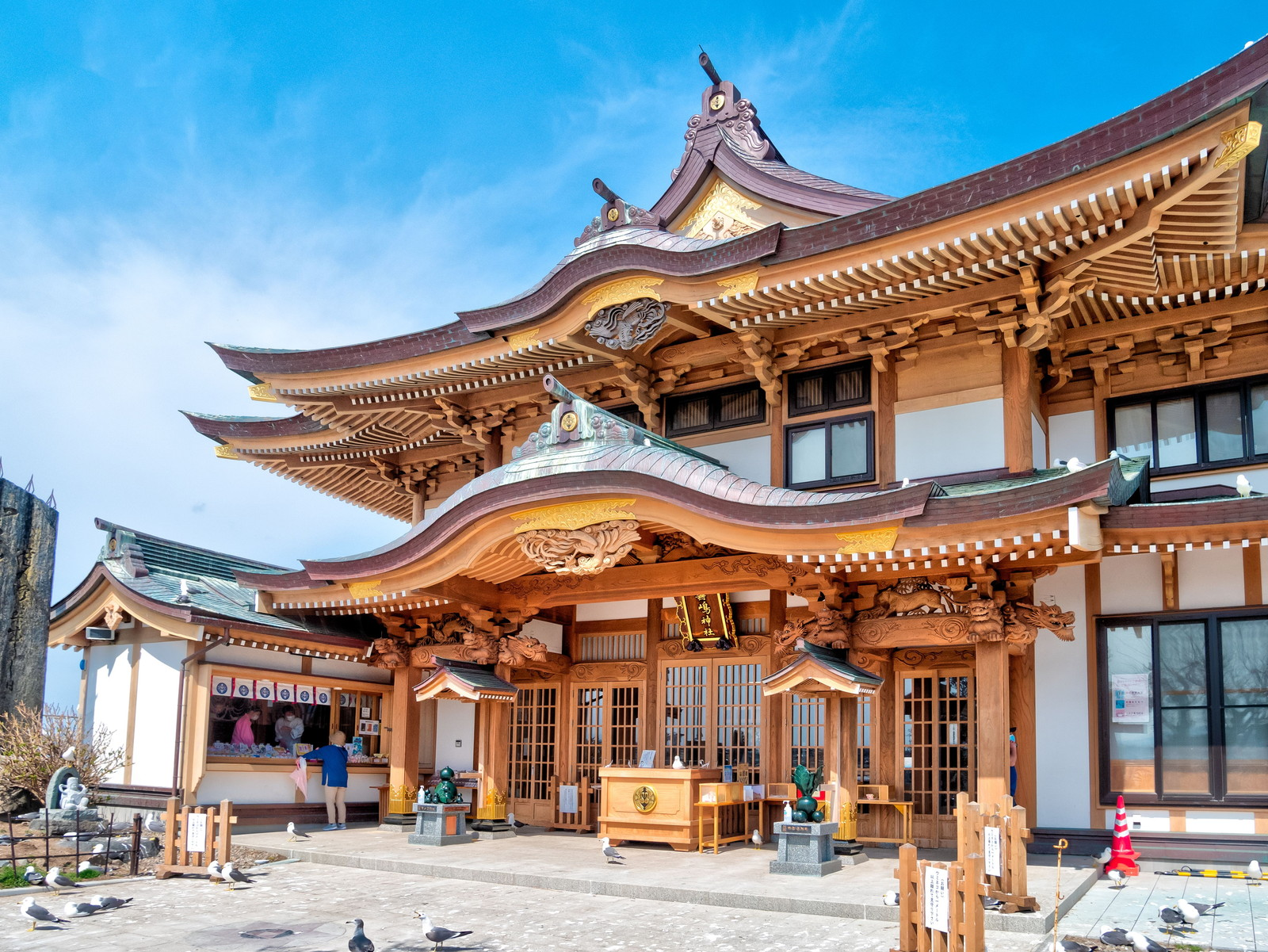

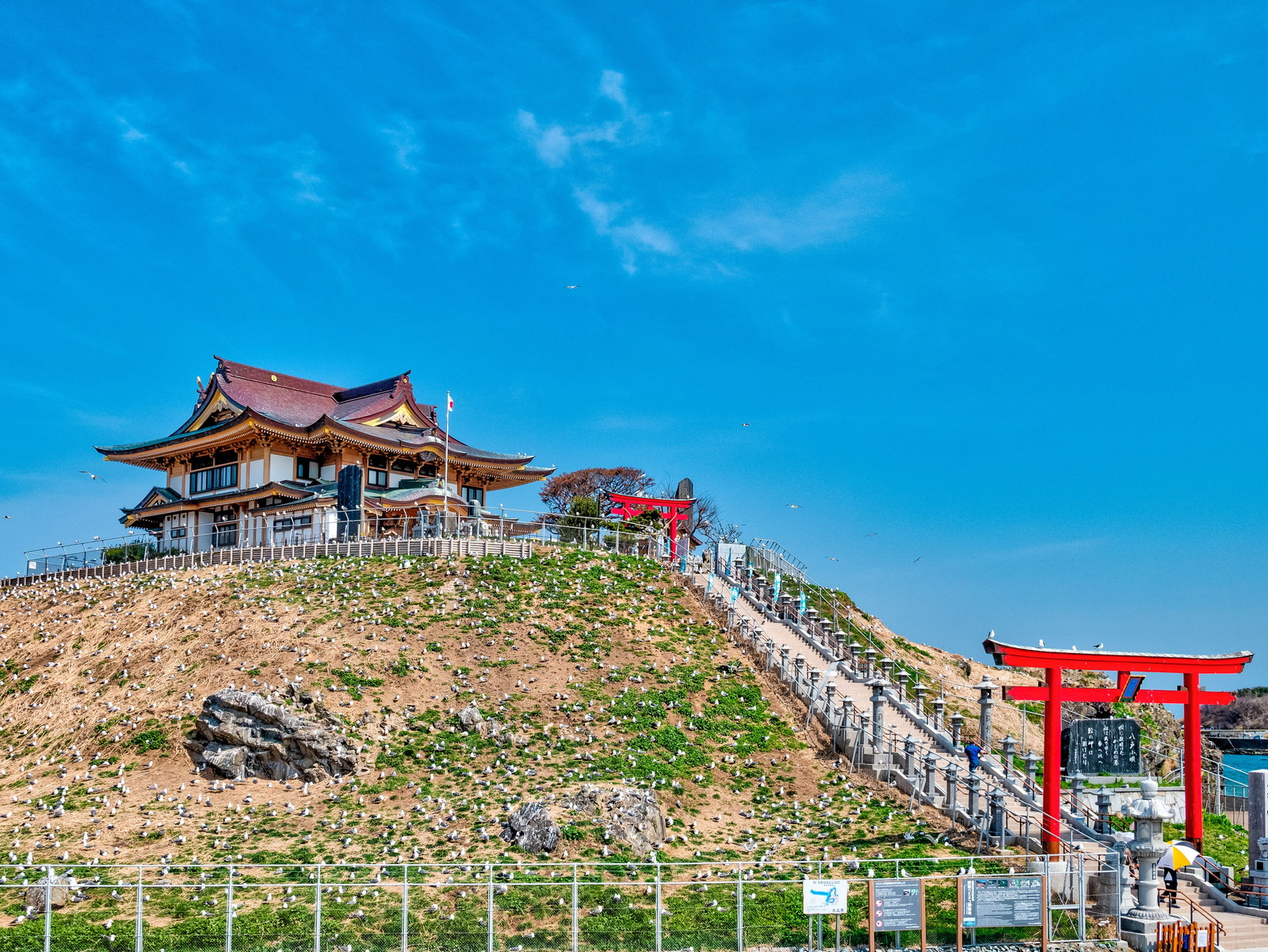

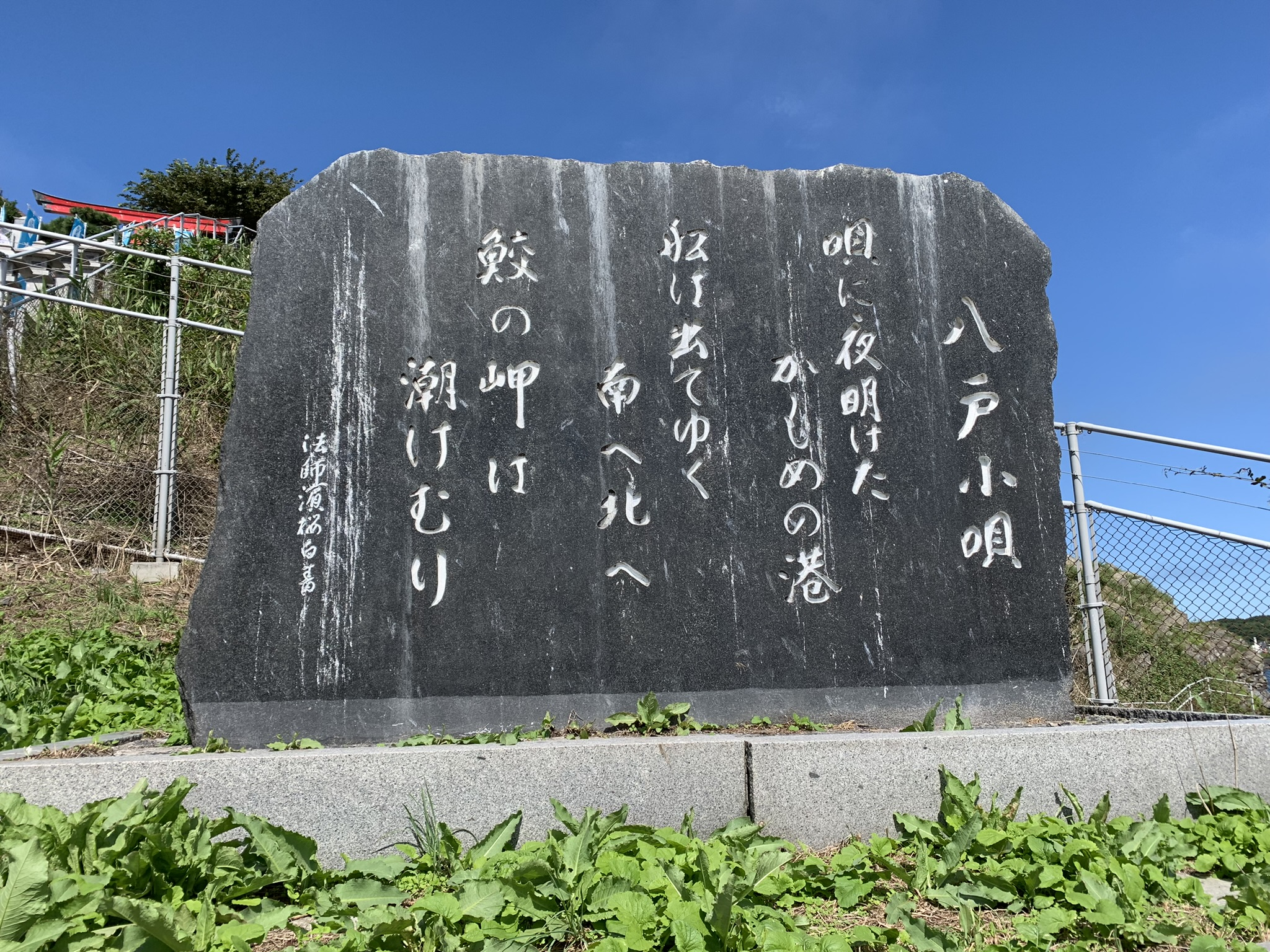

== See also ==
- List of Shinto shrines
