= Sinan Dadohae Biosphere Reserve =

Sinan Dadohae
- Location within South Korea
- Location: Sinan, South Jeolla, South Korea
- Coordinates: 34°35′14″N 125°41′8″E
- Area: 323,874 ha (800,310 acres)
- Established: 2009

Korean name
- Hangul: 신안다도해
- Hanja: 新安多島海
- Revised Romanization: Sinan Dadohae
- McCune–Reischauer: Sinan Tadohae

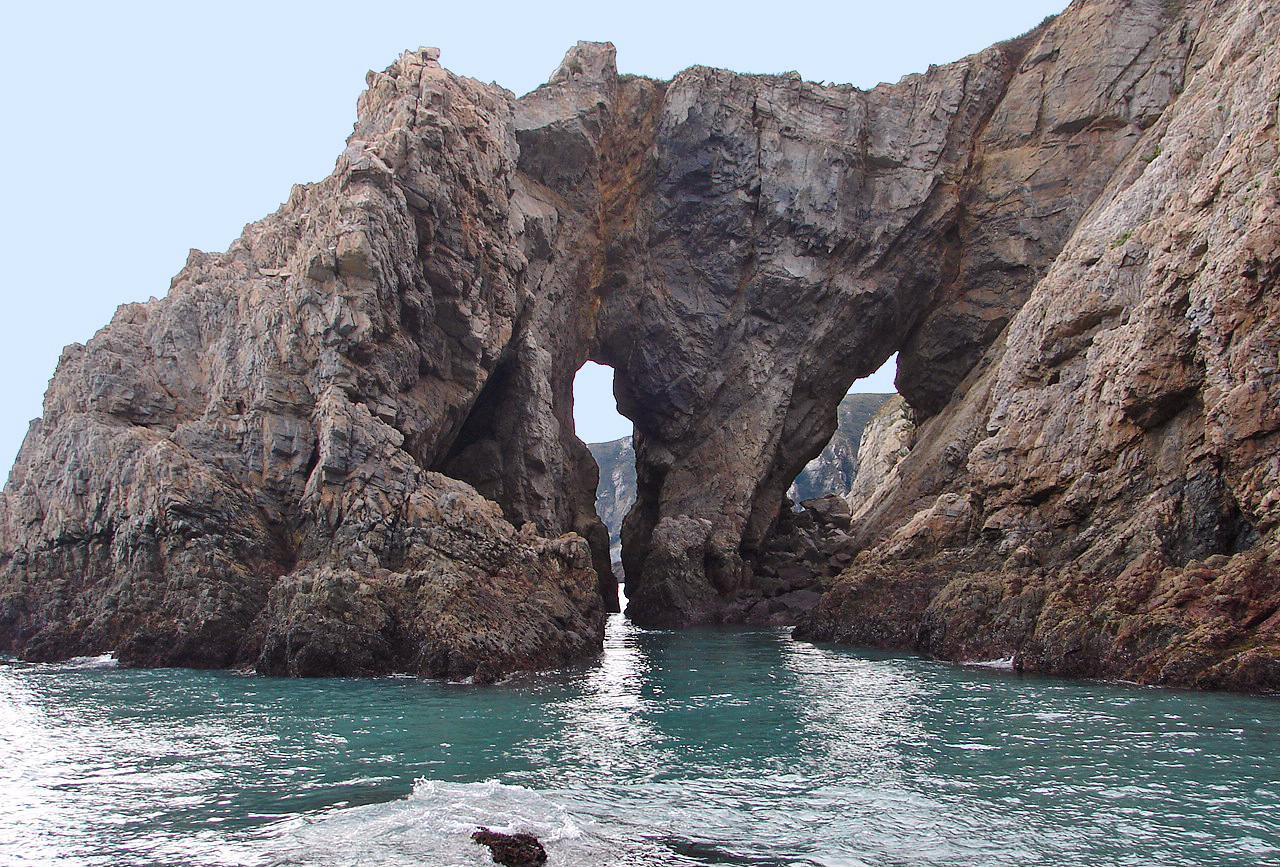
Coastal rock formation on Heuksando, one of the islands in the Sinan Dadohae Biosphere Reserve.

The Sinan Dadohae Biosphere Reserve is located in the southwest of the Republic of Korea and consists of 1,000 islands including Heuksando, Hongdo, Bigeumdo, Dochodo and Jeungdo. The total area consists of five hundreds islands, with more than 1,000 km of coastline. A large tidal flat, an important habitat for marine animals and rare migratory birds, also supports fishing and salt production for local people.

== Ecology ==
There are four distinct ecological zones in the reserve. The temperate evergreen broadleaf forest includes dominant species such as Castanopsis cuspidata, silver magnolia, and camellia trees. There are also herbaceous plants such as Ardisia japonica, Hedera rhombea, Saeri trees, and Kalopanax pictus. The dune vegetation zone includes Ischaemum anthephoroides, Zoysia macrostachya, Vitex rotundifolia, Calystegia soldanella, Messerschmidia sibirica, and a colony of Carex kobomugi on Jeungdo Island. Several unusual species, including Phragmites communis and Vitex rotundifolia are distributed throughout the dunes. There are a number of uninhabited islands that contain evergreen coniferous forest zones. This zone includes a colony of Japanese black pine trees on the seashores and hill sides. The tidal flat zone includes wetland and coastal areas. Phragmites reed communities are dominant in wetland areas. In the coastal area, various saltmarsh plants are developing such as halophyte communities. Many biological organisms are in the inter-tidal zone. The surface of the tidal flat is an important habitat for diatoms and plankton. Due to the complexity of ecological circulation and the food chain, many shells and invertebrate are found here. The biosphere reserves has two sites that are part of the Ramsar Wetland Convention, Jangdo Island High Moor and Jeungdo Tidal Flat.

== Socio-economic characteristics ==
Research is being conducted in order to develop areas for mountain climbing and recreation. Businesses based on indigenous knowledge are conducted within the tidal flats and Dadohae National Park. Sun dried salt is a local specialty that is produced in the tidal flats. Eco-friendly fishery and fish breeding is conducted in the transitional areas.
