= Fumi-shima =

Island in Japan

Coordinates: 35°25′49″N 132°37′36″E

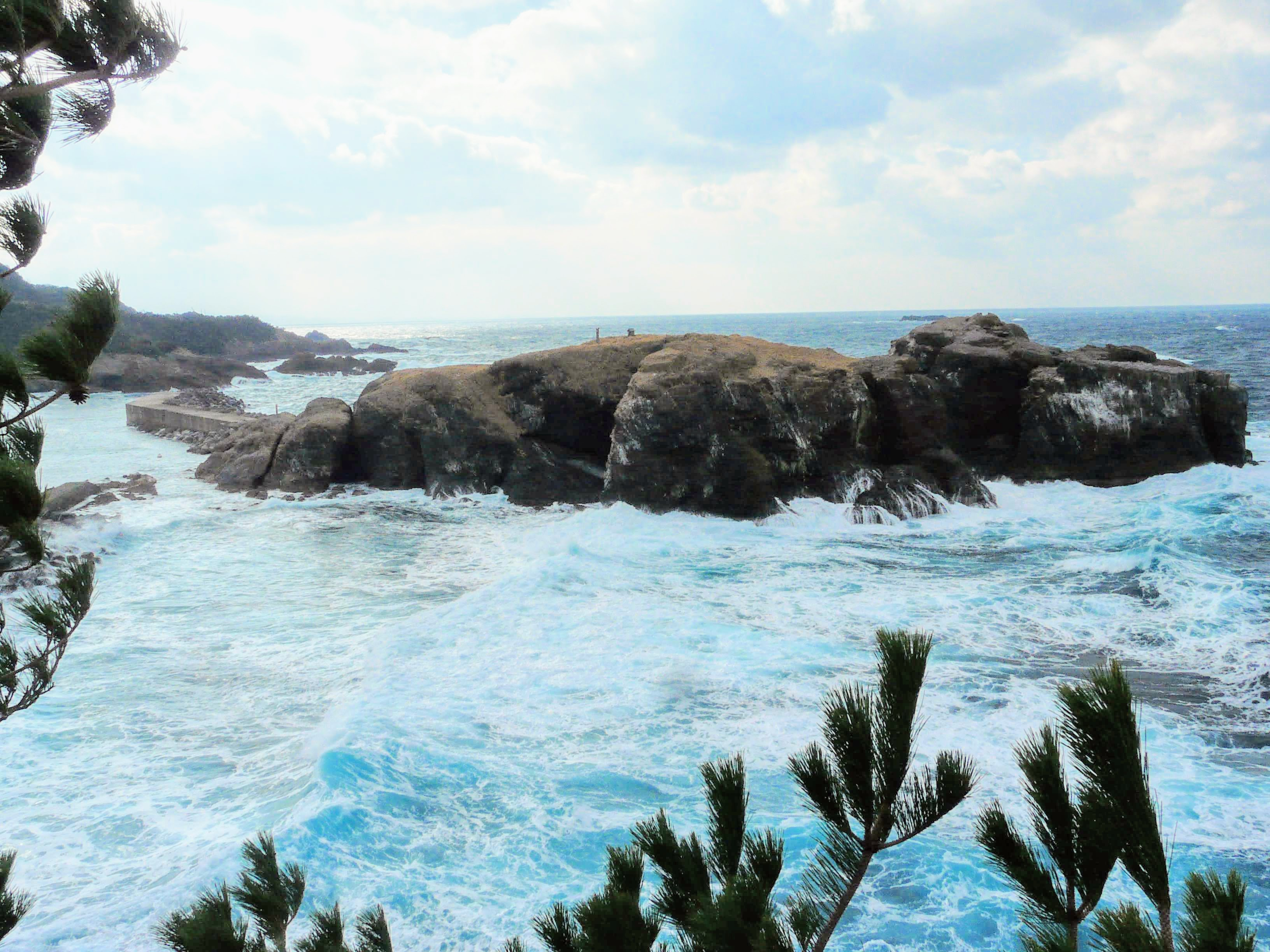
Fumi-shima in January 2022

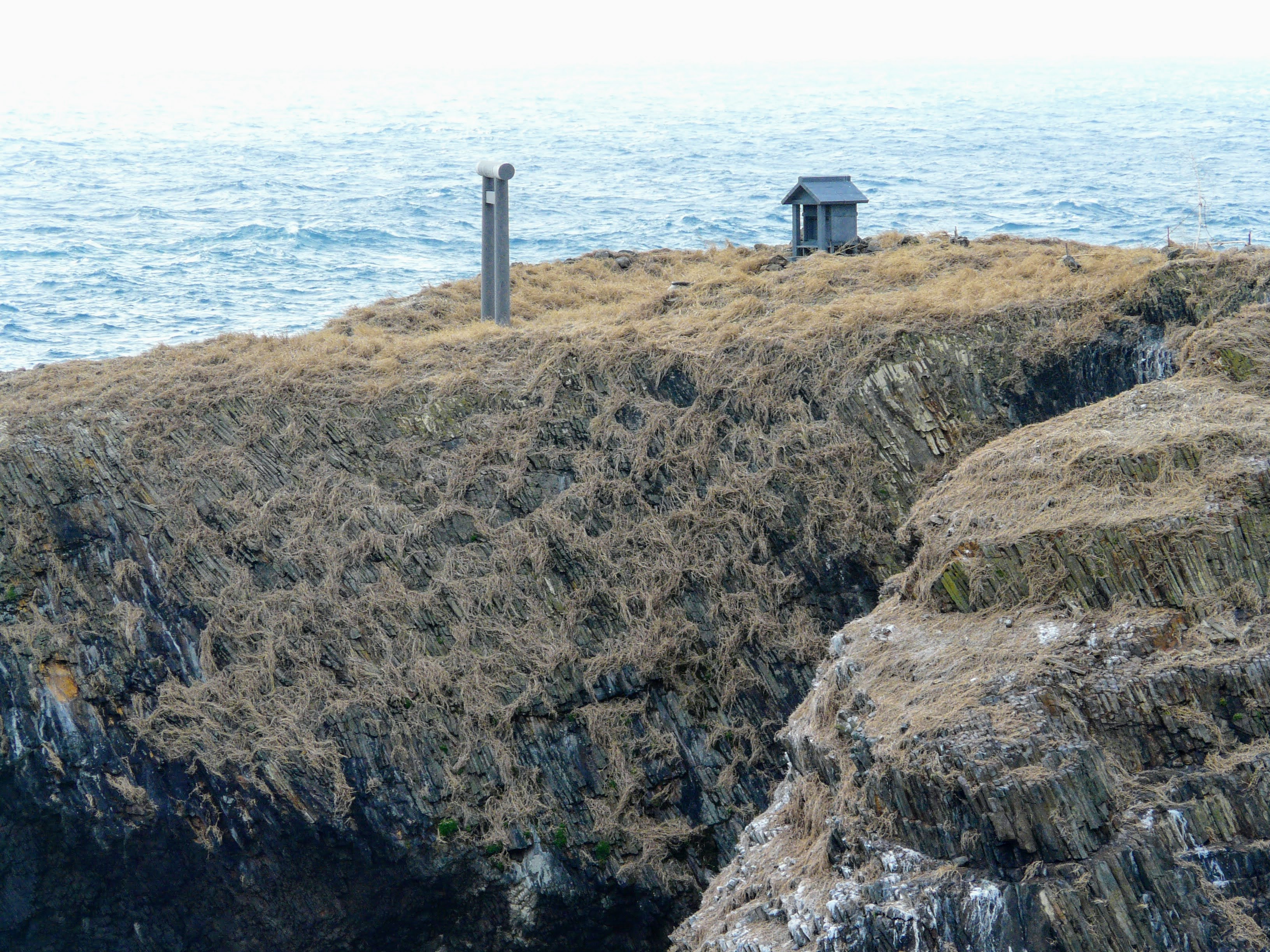
Fumi-shima Jinja (Shinto Shrine) in Fumi-shima

Fumi-shima (経島) is an islet 180 metres (590 ft) from the shore near Izumo, Shimane, Japan. It is a nesting place for around 5,000 Black-tailed Gulls each Spring, and has been recognised as an Important Bird Area (IBA) by BirdLife International. The islet used to have a shrine dedicated to Hinomisaki Jinja. Only the shrine priests were allowed to visit the island so the gulls settled virtually undisturbed.
