= Kabushima =

Island in Japan

Native name: 蕪島 Nickname: Seagull Island
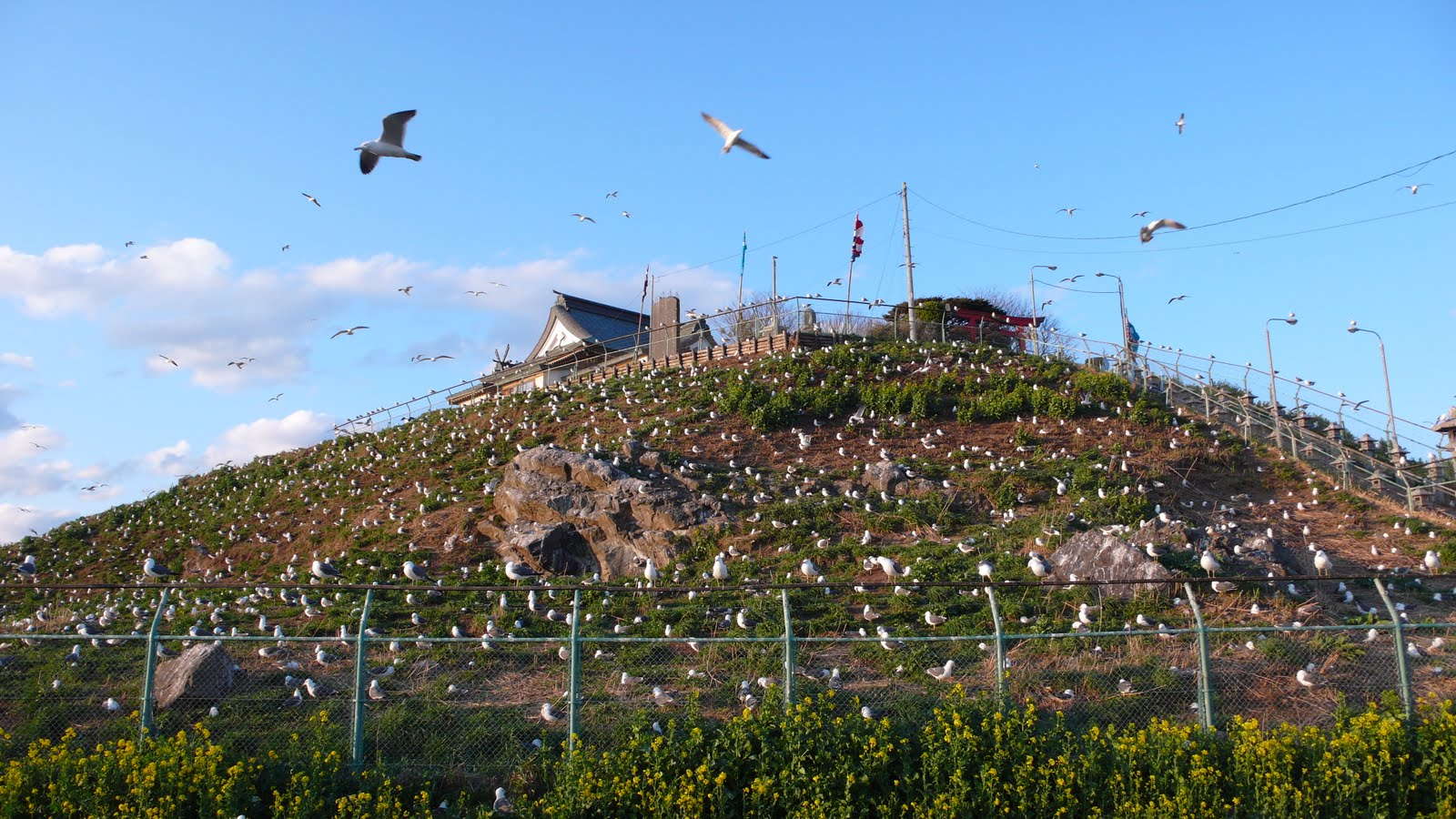

- Location within Aomori Prefecture

Geography
- Location: Hachinohe, Aomori
- Coordinates: 40°32′20″N 141°33′27″E
- Length: 300 m (1000 ft)
- Width: 140 m (460 ft)
- Coastline: 800 m (2600 ft)
- Highest elevation: 19 m (62 ft)

Administration
- Japan

Kabushima (蕪島) is a small island located in Hachinohe, Aomori, in the Tōhoku region of northern Japan. Part of the Tanesashi Coast, it was incorporated into the Sanriku Fukkō National Park from May 2013.

== Geography ==
The island has a length of 300 meters (980 ft) and a width of 140 m (460 ft). The highest point of the island measures 18 m (59 ft) in elevation. The total area of the island is approximately 0.017 km^{2} (0.0066 sq mi). Although called it is an island, it is connected to the mainland by a causeway constructed in 1942 so that people may walk to it from the shore.

=== Important Bird Area ===
The island is noted as a nesting ground for black-tailed gulls and has been protected as a National Natural Monument of Japan since 1922. It has also been recognised as an Important Bird Area (IBA) by BirdLife International. The sound of the umi-neko at Hachinohe was selected by the Ministry of the Environment as one of the 100 Soundscapes of Japan.

== Kabushima Shrine ==
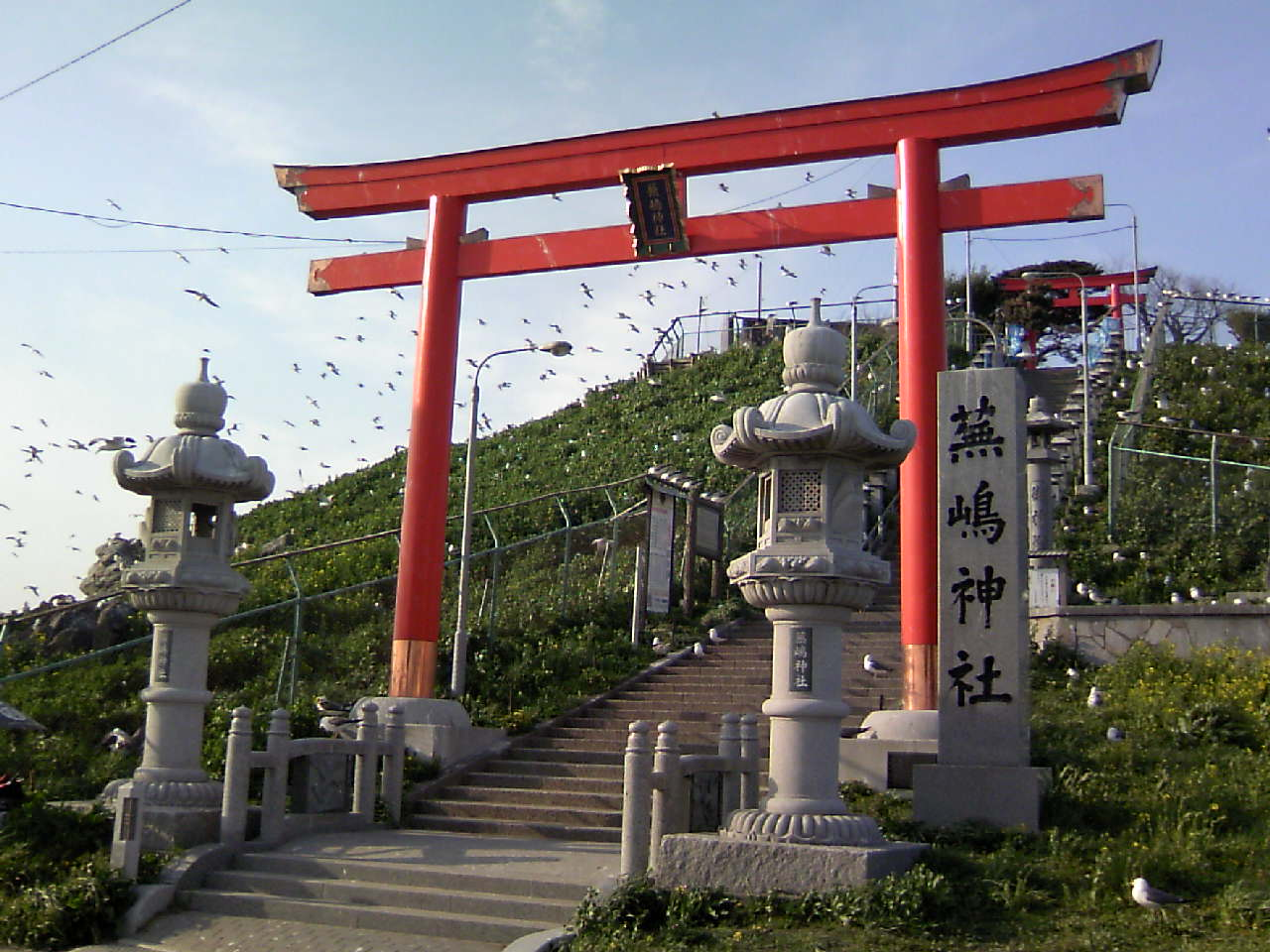
Kabushima Shrine

Kabushima Shrine (蕪島 神社, Kabushima Jinja) is a small Shinto shrine located on Kabushima island. The shrine is a branch of the Itsukushima Shrine and is dedicated to Benzaiten. According to shrine legend, it was established in 1269 by local fishermen. The shrine burned completely down on 5 November 2015, but it was rebuilt and expanded at the cost of 5 billion yen. The shrine reopened on 26 March 2020 after a small reopening ceremony, which was scaled down due to the COVID-19 pandemic. The main festival of the shrine is held on the third Sunday of April.
