= Hongdo =

Island and nature reserve in South Korea

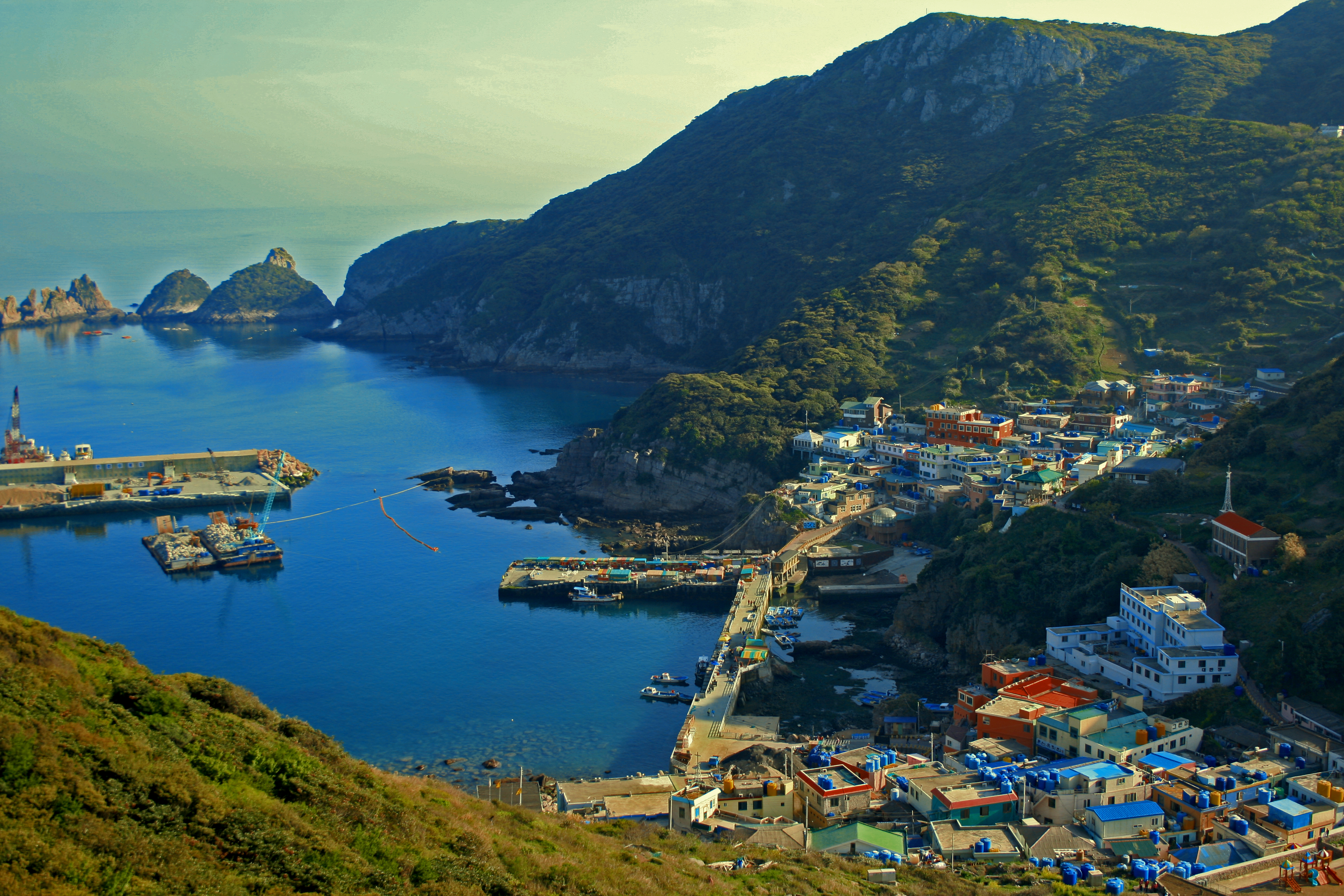

- Location within South Korea
- Coordinates: 34°41′35″N 125°11′50″E
- Country: South Korea

Area
  - Total: 6.47 km^{2} (2.50 sq mi)

Population (2001)
  - Total: 710
  - Density: 110/km^{2} (280/sq mi)

Korean name
- Hangul: 홍도
- Hanja: 紅島
- RR: Hongdo
- MR: Hongdo

Hongdo (Korean: 홍도) is an island in the Yellow Sea located 115 km from the southwest coast of Mokpo port, Jeollanam-do, South Korea. It covers an area of 6.47 km² and consists of steep mountain range, the highest peaks of which are Gitdaebong (깃대봉 378 m) and Yangsanbong (양산봉 231 m). It is within the administrative boundary of Sinan County, Jeollanam-do, South Korea. The island's 6.47 km² are home to about 710 people. The protected area is 5.87 km².

On Hongdo, meaning "Red Island" due to the red coloring found on many of the rocky outcroppings, there are about 270 varieties of evergreens and 170 species of animals. The government wished to preserve the natural state of the island so Hongdo was designated as a Natural Preserve Area in 1965, and became part of Dadohae Marine National Park in 1981. Because the entire island is declared a Natural Monument, no one is allowed to enter areas other than the villages and designated tourist areas.

== Gallery ==
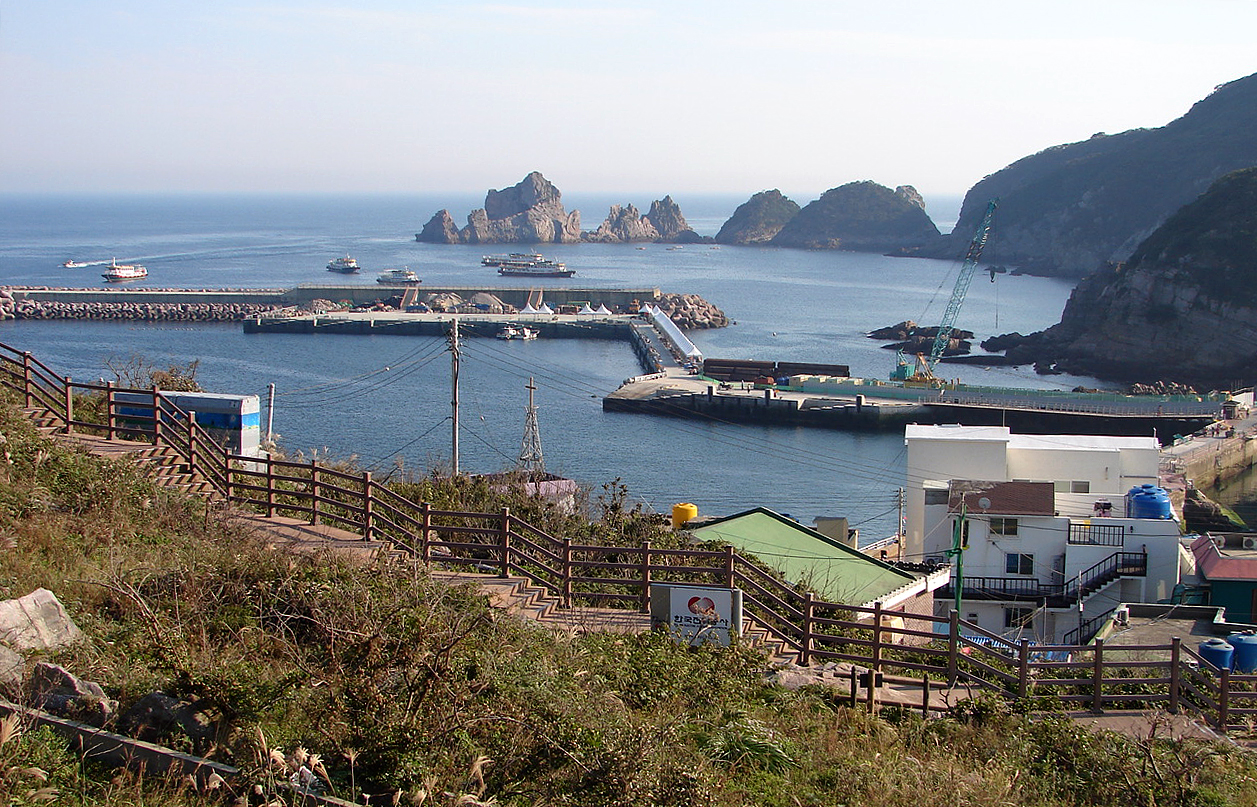

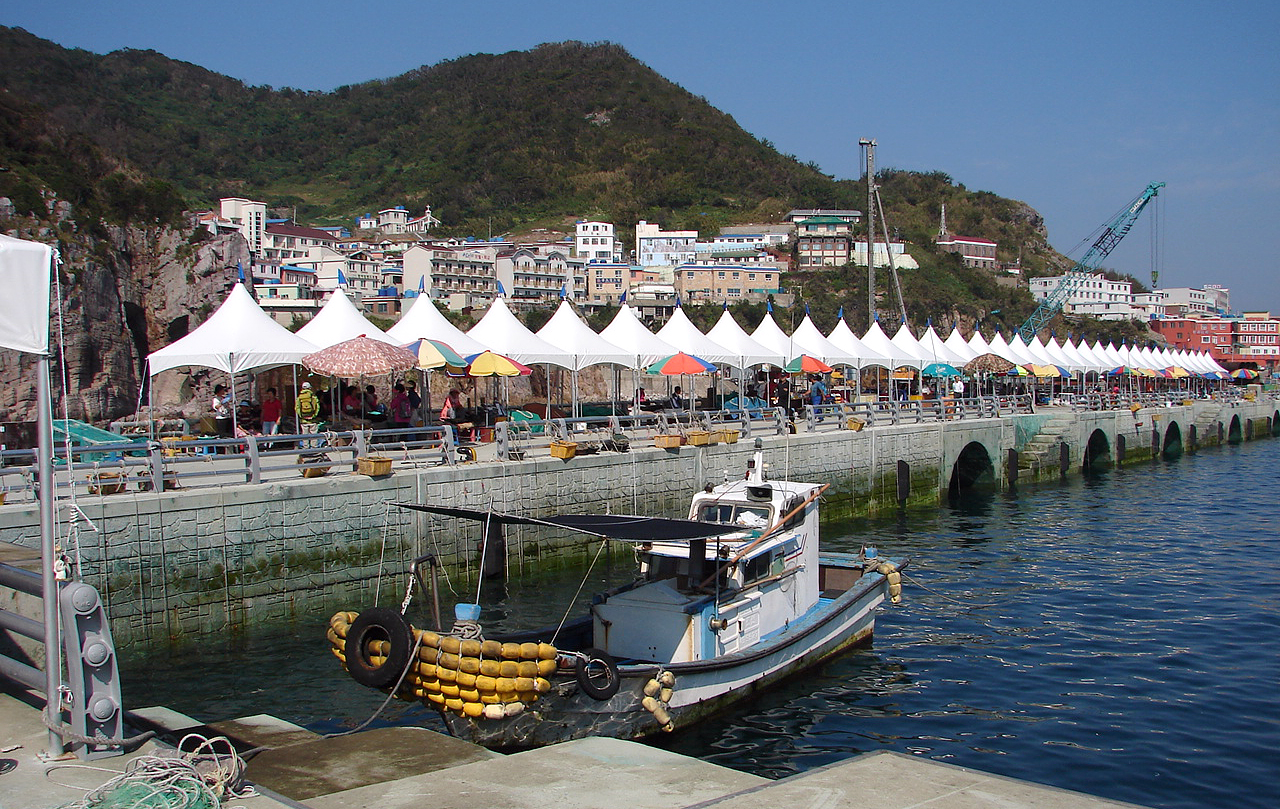

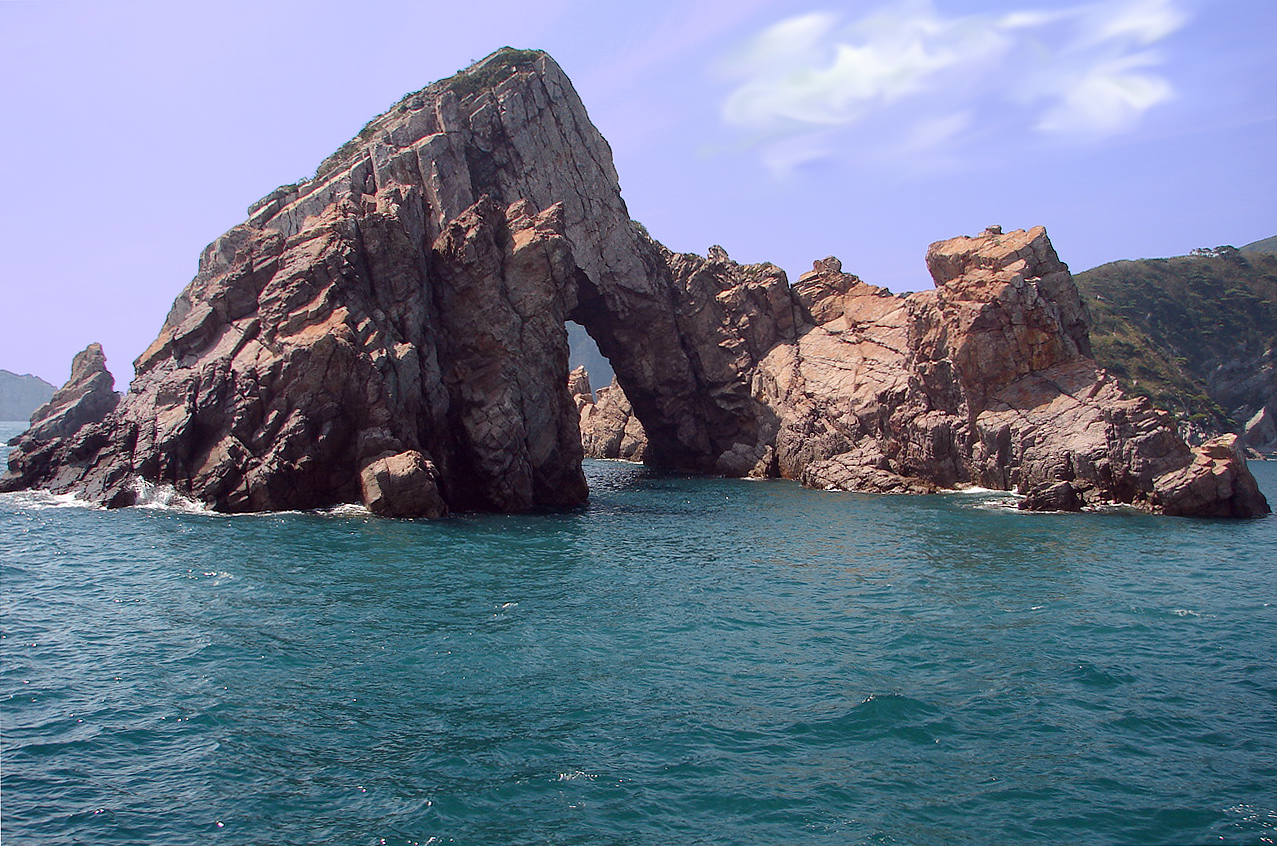

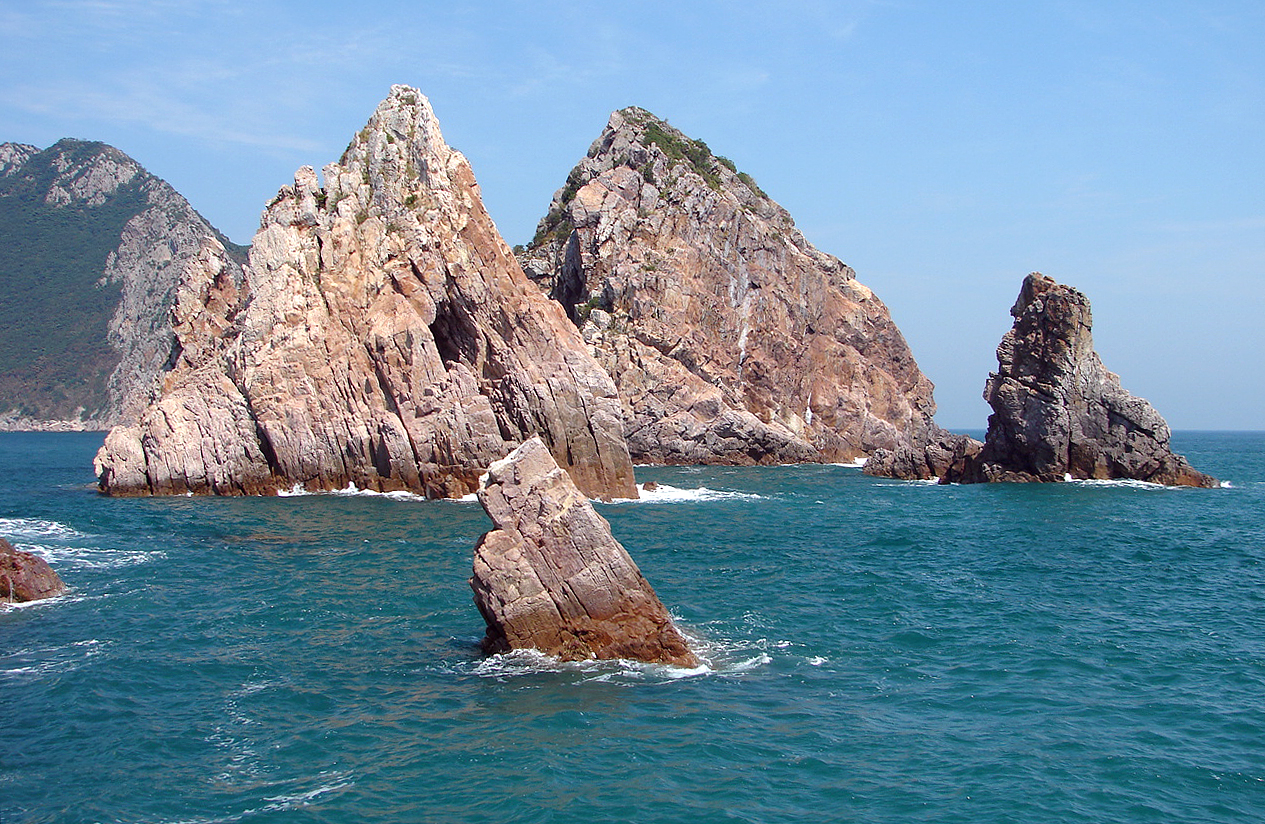

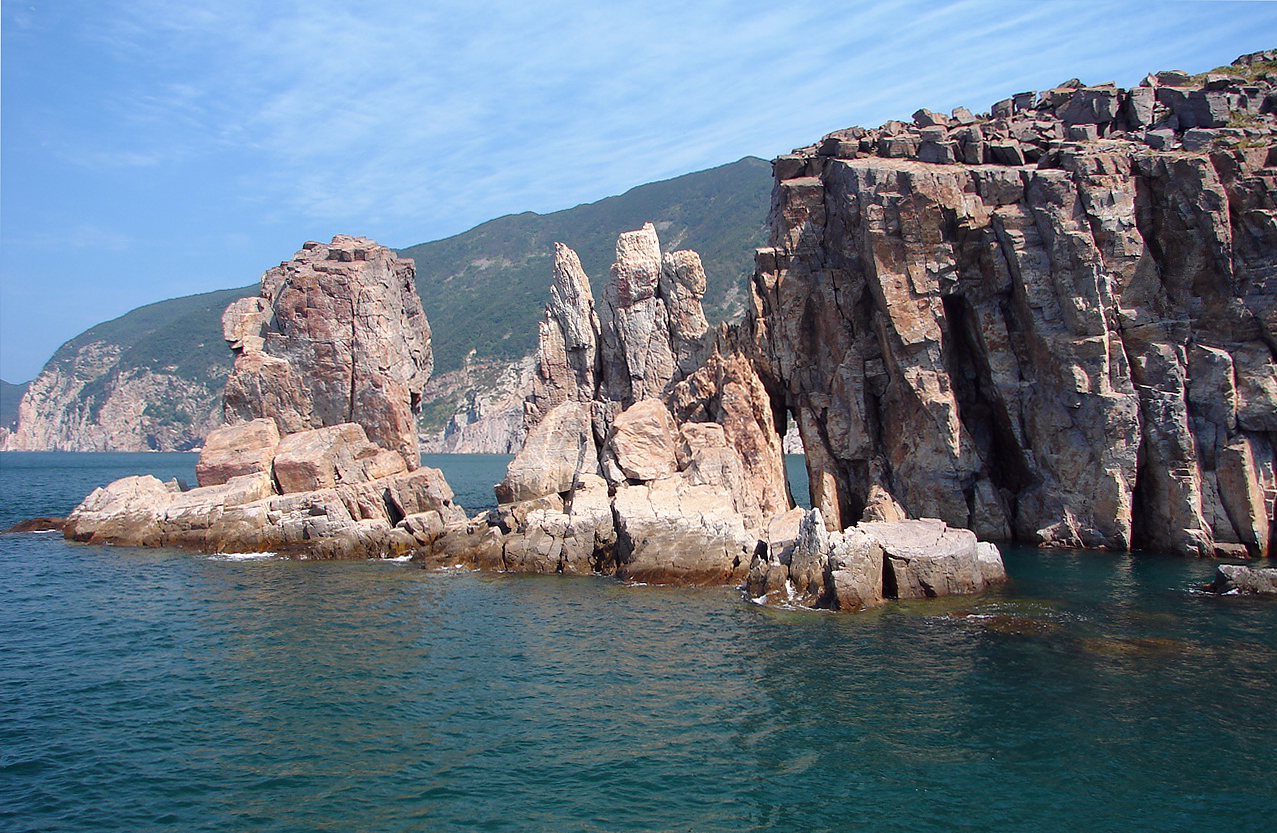

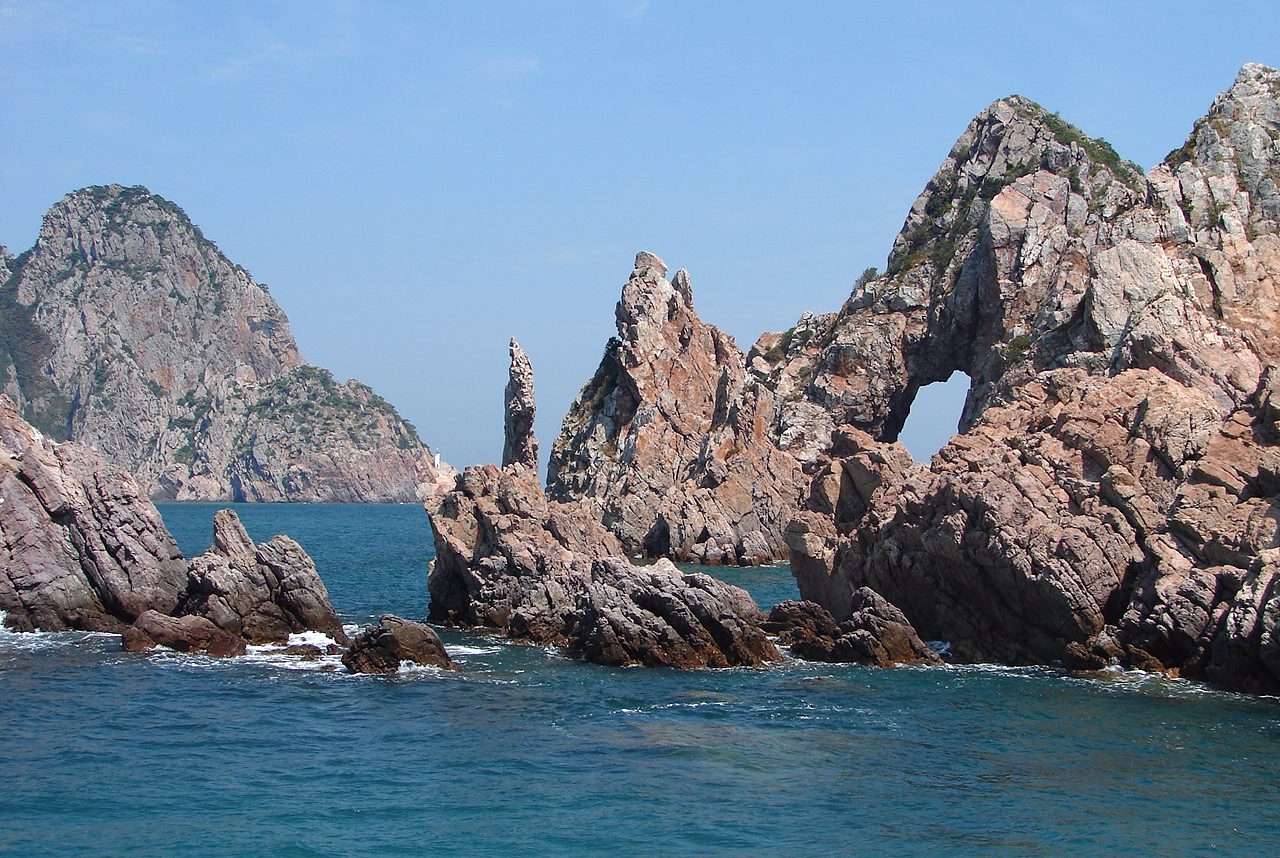

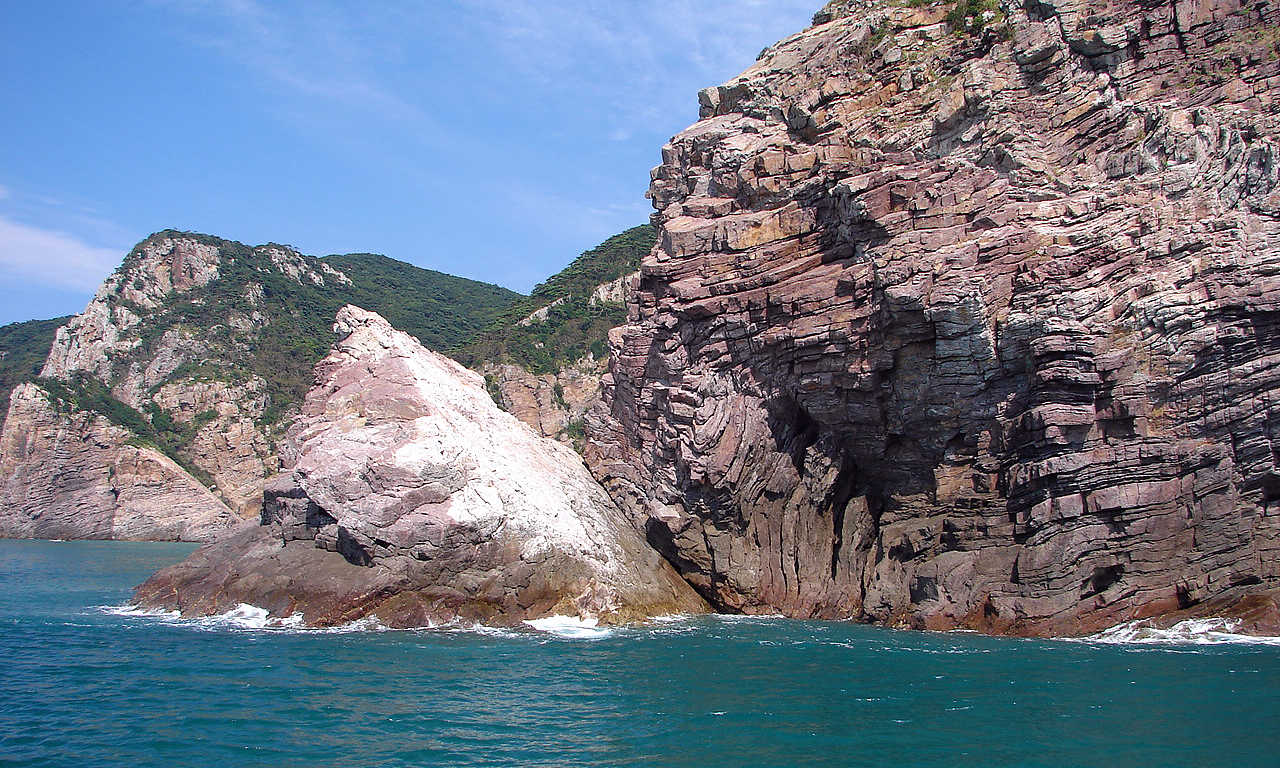

== See also ==
- Chang Pogo
- Islands of South Korea
