= Gitdaebong =

Mountain in South Korea

Coordinates: 34°41′42″N 125°12′07″E

Highest point
- Elevation: 368 m (1,207 ft)

Geography
- Location: South Jeolla Province, South Korea

Gitdaebong (Korean: 깃대봉) is a mountain of South Jeolla Province, southwestern South Korea. It has an elevation of 368 metres.

== See also ==
- List of mountains of Korea
