= Hanma Biosphere Reserve =

Protected area in China

Hanma
- Location within China
- Location: Inner Mongolia, China
- Coordinates: 51°35′24″N 122°40′45″E
- Area: 148,948 ha (368,060 acres)
- Established: 2015

Ramsar Wetland
- Official name: Inner Mongolia Grand Khingan Hanma Wetlands
- Designated: 8 January 2018
- Reference no.: 2351

The Hanma Biosphere Reserve is located in Inner Mongolia and encompasses a significant part of the boreal forest (Taiga) found in China. The reserve covers a range of forest and wetland ecosystems rich in biological diversity, including many types of endangered and rare species. Ecological interference by humans is minimal, resulting in abundant natural resources and the high quality of local vegetation and ecology. The cold temperate coniferous forest represents the most well-preserved forest system in China and is of significant scientific value.

The local wetlands include Larix gmelinii swamps and Carex wetlands and have retained their original natural landscapes and wetland functions. The biosphere reserve plays a significant role in protecting water and rare wildlife resources, ensuring water purification, and maintaining the ecological balance of the Heilongjiang area and Jiliuhe River.

== Ecology ==
The reserve is situated at a high altitude on the western part of the main ridge of the northern Greater Khingan Mountains. The surrounding mountains form a flat valley stretching north to south for 56 km and 32 km wide.

The reserve includes a wide variety of wetlands covering more than 20,000 ha, including river wetlands, lake wetlands, marsh wetlands, forest swamp, bush swamp and herbaceous swamp. The reserve also belongs to a coniferous forest ecosystem amid tundra mountains. The main vegetation forms within the reserve are Taiga forest and coniferous forest including Pinus pumila elfin and Pinus sylvestris.

Hanma has a highly abundant biological diversity. Typical species include the Siberian salamander (Salamandrella keyserlingii), wolverine (Gulo gulo), moose (Alces alces cameloides), Siberian musk deer (Moschus moschiferus), sable (Martes zibellina), great grey owl (Strix nebulosa) and other near arctic animals.

== Socio-economic characteristics ==
The biosphere reserve contains the last Reindeer tribe in China distributed in and around the transition area. Thirty Evenks people owning about 300 reindeers live in the transition area as permanent inhabitants. However, the elderly and children often leave the reserve to obtain medical treatment and education, and also leave for warmer climates during the winter. The tribe's lifestyle based on hunting and living on grassland has endured for centuries and persists to this day. Their social development has resulted in the creation of remarkable minority culture based upon Shamanism, which has given local hunters a deep belief in worshipping nature and protecting natural beings. Their religious traditions, agricultural production, ways of living and unique cultural customs have left a profound mark on the Hanma Biosphere Reserve and play an important role in the region’s natural protection. The Evenks' love and passion for nature, forests and lakes have been instrumental in maintaining the state of the forest.

Approximately 43,536 people live around the periphery of the Hanma reserve, including 17,641 people at Jinhe Town, 19,363 people at Ah Longshan Town and 6,532 people at Niuerhe Town. These communities rely on the natural resources of the reserve in terms of ecosystem products and services, for example, gathering and selling berries and fungi from the transition area of the reserve.
