= Matsushima, Miyagi =

Matsushima 松島町
- Town
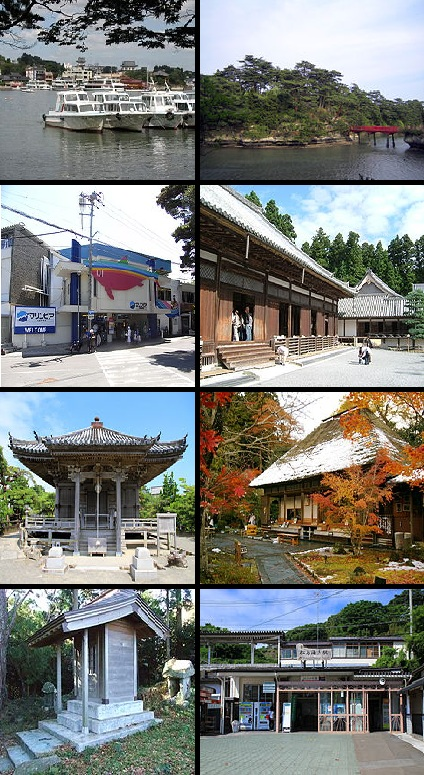
- Top left: Matsushima Port, top right: Togetsukyō Bridge to Oshima Island, 2nd left: Matsushima Marinpia Aquarium (closed), 2nd right: Zuiganji Temple, 3rd left: Godaidō, 3rd right: Entsuin Temple, bottom left: Atago Shrine, bottom right: Matsushima Kaigan Train Station

- Flag Seal

- Location of Matsushima in Miyagi Prefecture

- Coordinates: 38°22′48.6″N 141°04′2.4″E
- Country: Japan
- Region: Tōhoku
- Prefecture: Miyagi
- District: Miyagi
- First official recorded: 807 AD
- Town settled: January 1, 1928

Government
  - Mayor: Kouichi Sakurai (since October 2015)

Area
  - Total: 53.56 km^{2} (20.68 sq mi)

Population (June 1, 2020)
  - Total: 13,804
  - Density: 257.7/km^{2} (667.5/sq mi)
- Time zone: UTC+9 (Japan Standard Time)
- Tree: Pine
- Flower: Sekikoku
- Phone number: 022-354-5701
- Address: 10 Takagi-aza-chō, Matsushima-machi, Miyagi-gun, Miyagi-ken 981-0215
- Website: Official website

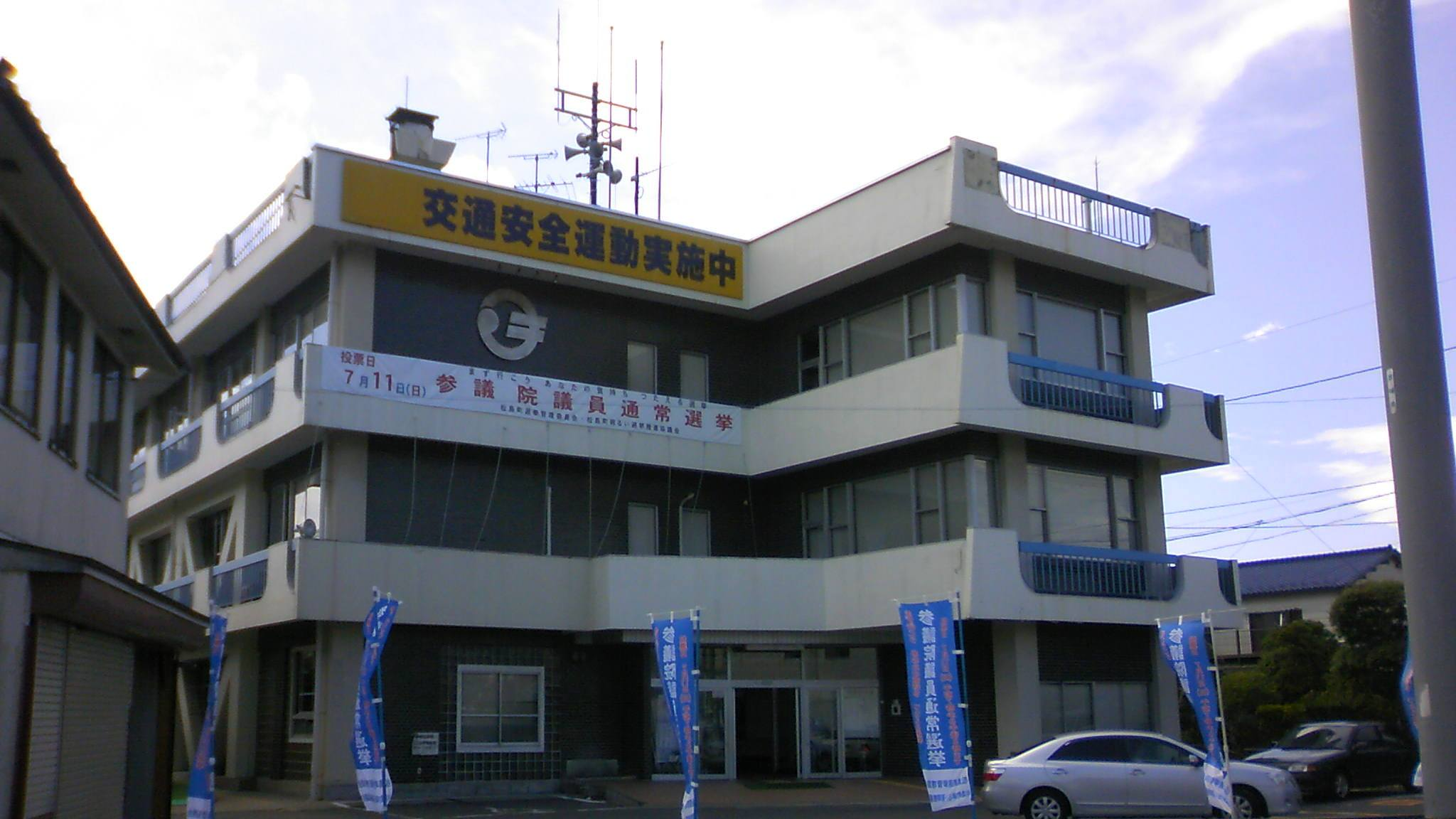
Matsushima Town Office

Matsushima (松島町, Matsushima-machi) is a town in Miyagi Prefecture, Japan. As of 1 June 2019, the town had an estimated population of 13,804 in 5663 households, and a population density of 260 persons per km^{2}. The total area of the town is 53.56 square kilometres (20.68 sq mi). It is most famous as the location of Matsushima Bay, one of the Three Views of Japan, and is also the site of the Zuigan-ji, Entsū-in and Kanrantei.

== Geography ==
Matsushima is located in east-central Miyagi Prefecture, with Matsushima Bay to the east. The town's highest point is Mount Danyama, with a height of 178 meters.

=== Neighboring municipalities ===
Miyagi Prefecture

- Higashimatsushima
- Misato
- Ōsaki
- Ōsato
- Rifu

=== Climate ===
Matsushima has a humid subtropical climate (Köppen climate classification Cfa) characterized by mild summers and cold winters. The average annual temperature in Higashi-Matsushima is 12.0 °C. The average annual rainfall is 1207 mm with September as the wettest month. The temperatures are highest on average in August, at around 24.5 °C, and lowest in January, at around 0.6 °C.

== Demographics ==
Per Japanese census data, the population of Matsushima has declined over the past 30 years.

Historical population
Year	Pop.	±%
1920	7,644	—
1930	9,155	+19.8%
1940	10,064	+9.9%
1950	15,333	+52.4%
1960	15,045	−1.9%
1970	16,004	+6.4%
1980	17,246	+7.8%
1990	17,431	+1.1%
2000	17,059	−2.1%
2010	15,085	−11.6%
2020	13,323	−11.7%

== History ==
The area of present-day Matsushima was part of ancient Mutsu Province and has been settled since at least the Jōmon period. The Daigigakoi Shell Mound is one of the largest shell middens to have been discovered in Japan. With the establishment of Tagajō in the Nara period, Matsushima was part of the Yamato colonization area in the region. The Buddhist temple of Zuigan-ji comes to have been founded in 828 AD. During the Sengoku period, the area was contested by samurai clans before it came under the control of the Date clan of Sendai Domain during the Edo period, under the Tokugawa shogunate.

The village of Matsushima within Miyagi District, Miyagi was established on June 1, 1889, with the post-Meiji restoration establishment of the modern municipalities system. It was raised to town status on December 16, 1963.

== Government ==
Matsushima has a mayor-council form of government with a directly elected mayor and a unicameral town council of 14 members. Matsushima, as part of Miyagi District contributes one seat to the Miyagi Prefectural legislature. In terms of national politics, the town is part of Miyagi 5th district of the lower house of the Diet of Japan.

== Economy ==
The economy of Matsushima is largely based on tourism, farming, and commercial fishing, primarily the cultivation of oysters in Matsushima Bay.

== Education ==
Matsushima has three public elementary schools and one public middle school operated by the town government and one public high school operated by the Miyagi Prefectural Board of Education.

== Transportation ==
=== Railway ===
East Japan Railway Company (JR East) - Tōhoku Main Line

- Matsushima, Atago, Shinainuma

East Japan Railway Company (JR East) - Senseki Line

- Matsushima-Kaigan, Takagimachi, Tetaru, Rikuzen-Tomiyama

=== Highway ===
- Sanriku Expressway (Matsushima-Ōsato IC — Matsushima-Kita IC)
- National Route 45
- National Route 346

=== Seaports ===
- Port of Matsushima - Matsushima sightseeing boats

== Local attractions ==
- Entsū-in
- Matsushima, one of the Three Views of Japan
- Nishinohama Shell Mound, a National Historic Site
- Zuigan-ji, founded 828 AD

== External relations ==
=== International sister cities ===
- (France) Isle of Pines, New Caledonia, since September 4, 1980

=== Japanese sister cities ===
- (Japan) Kisakata, Akita, since August 1, 1987
- (Japan) Kami-Amakusa, Kumamoto (formerly known as Matsushima), since October 16, 1988

== Noted people from Matsushima ==
- Jun Senoue, musician
