= Matsuyamamachi Station (Miyagi) =

Railway station in Ōsaki, Miyagi Prefecture, Japan

Matsuyamamachi Station 松山町駅
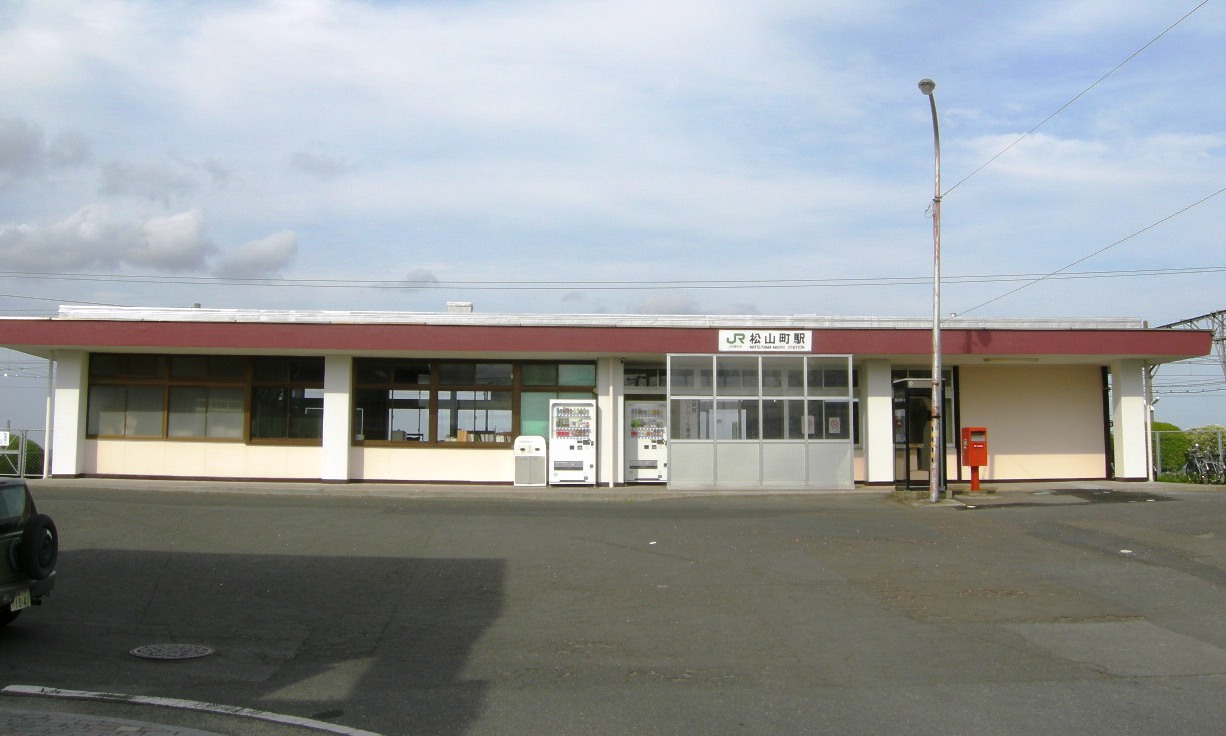
- Matsuyamamachi Station, June 2010

General information
- Location: 66 Akanuma-ue, Matsuyama Kanaya, Ōsaki-shi, Miyagi-ken 987-1303; Japan
- Coordinates: 38.5123°N 141.075°E
- Operator: JR East
- Line: ■ Tōhoku Main Line
- Distance: 391.5 km from Tokyo
- Platforms: 1 side + 1 island platform
- Tracks: 3

Construction
- Structure type: At grade

Other information
- Status: Staffed ("Midori no Madoguchi")
- Website: Official website

History
- Opened: December 25, 1908

Passengers
- FY2018: 592 daily

Services
Preceding station	JR East	Following station
Kashimadai towards Kuroiso	Tōhoku Main Line Local	Kogota towards Morioka
Location
- Location within Miyagi Prefecture Location within Japan

Matsuyamamachi Station (松山町駅, Matsuyamamachi-eki) is a railway station in the city of Ōsaki, Miyagi Prefecture, Japan, operated by the East Japan Railway Company (JR East).

== Lines ==
Matsuyamamachi Station is served by the Tōhoku Main Line, and is located 391.5 rail kilometers from the official starting point of the line at Tokyo Station.

== Station layout ==
The station has one ground-level side platform and one ground-level island platform connected to the station building by a footbridge. The station has a Midori no Madoguchi staffed ticket office.

=== Platforms ===
1	■ Tōhoku Main Line	for Kogota and Ichinoseki
2	■ Tōhoku Main Line	not in normal use
2	■ Tōhoku Main Line	for Matsushima and Sendai

== History ==
Matsuyamamachi Station opened on December 25, 1908. The station was absorbed into the JR East network upon the privatization of the Japanese National Railways (JNR) on April 1, 1987.

== Passenger statistics ==
In fiscal 2018, the station was used by an average of 592 passengers daily (boarding passengers only).

== Surrounding area ==
- National Route 356
- Kashimadai Post Office

== See also ==
- List of railway stations in Japan
