= Nishinohama Shell Mound =

Archaeological site in Japan

Nishinohama Shell Midden
- 西の浜貝塚 (Japanese)
- Location in Japan Nishinohama Shell Mound (Japan)
- 38°22′53″N 141°04′57″E
- Type: shell midden
- Periods: Jōmon period
- Location: Matsushima, Miyagi, Japan
- Region: Tōhoku region

Site notes
- Elevation: 25 m (82 ft)
- Length: 200 m (660 ft)
- Width: 130 m (430 ft)
- Public access: Yes (park)

Nishinohama Shell Midden (西の浜貝塚, Nishinohama Kaizuka) is an archaeological site containing a Jōmon period shell midden and the remains of an adjacent settlement located in what is now the town of Matsushima, Miyagi Prefecture in the Tōhoku region of northern Japan. It has been protected by the central government as a National Historic Site since 1974.

== Overview ==
During the early to middle Jōmon period (approximately 4000 to 2500 BC), sea levels were five to six meters higher than at present, and the ambient temperature was also 2 deg C higher. During this period, the Tōhoku region was inhabited by the Jōmon people, many of whom lived in coastal settlements. The middens associated with such settlements contain bone, botanical material, mollusc shells, sherds, lithics, and other artifacts and ecofacts associated with the now-vanished inhabitants, and these features, provide a useful source into the diets and habits of Jōmon society.

Most of these middens are found along the Pacific coast of Japan, and the rocky ria coast of Miyagi Prefecture was densely settled from the early through late Jōmon period.

Located on the northwest shore of Matsushima Bay, this shell midden is on a small peninsula about 15 meters from the current coastline. The midden measures 130 meters from east-west and 200 meters from north-south. As with the nearby Satohama shell mound, it is considered a type site for Jōmon period artifacts in the southern Tohoku region. Excavation in 1959 to 1960 and from 1966 to 1967 found remains from the early through the late Jōmon period, extending through the Yayoi period, Kofun period and into the early Heian period, indicating continuous occupation of this site for many thousands of years. Artifacts included bone fish hooks, harpoons and swords made from bone, along with the bones of deer and wild boar. A number of human remains were also found. Some of the earthenware pots found at the site appear to have been used for the production of sea salt.

The midden is now part of the Nishinohama Historical Site Park; however, the midden itself site backfilled after excavation, and there is now nothing to see except for a stone monument and plaque. The site is located about 14 minutes on foot from Takagimachi Station on the JR East Senseki Line.

== See also ==
- List of Historic Sites of Japan (Miyagi)
