= Kashimadai Station =

Railway station in Ōsaki, Miyagi Prefecture, Japan

Kashimadai Station 鹿島台駅
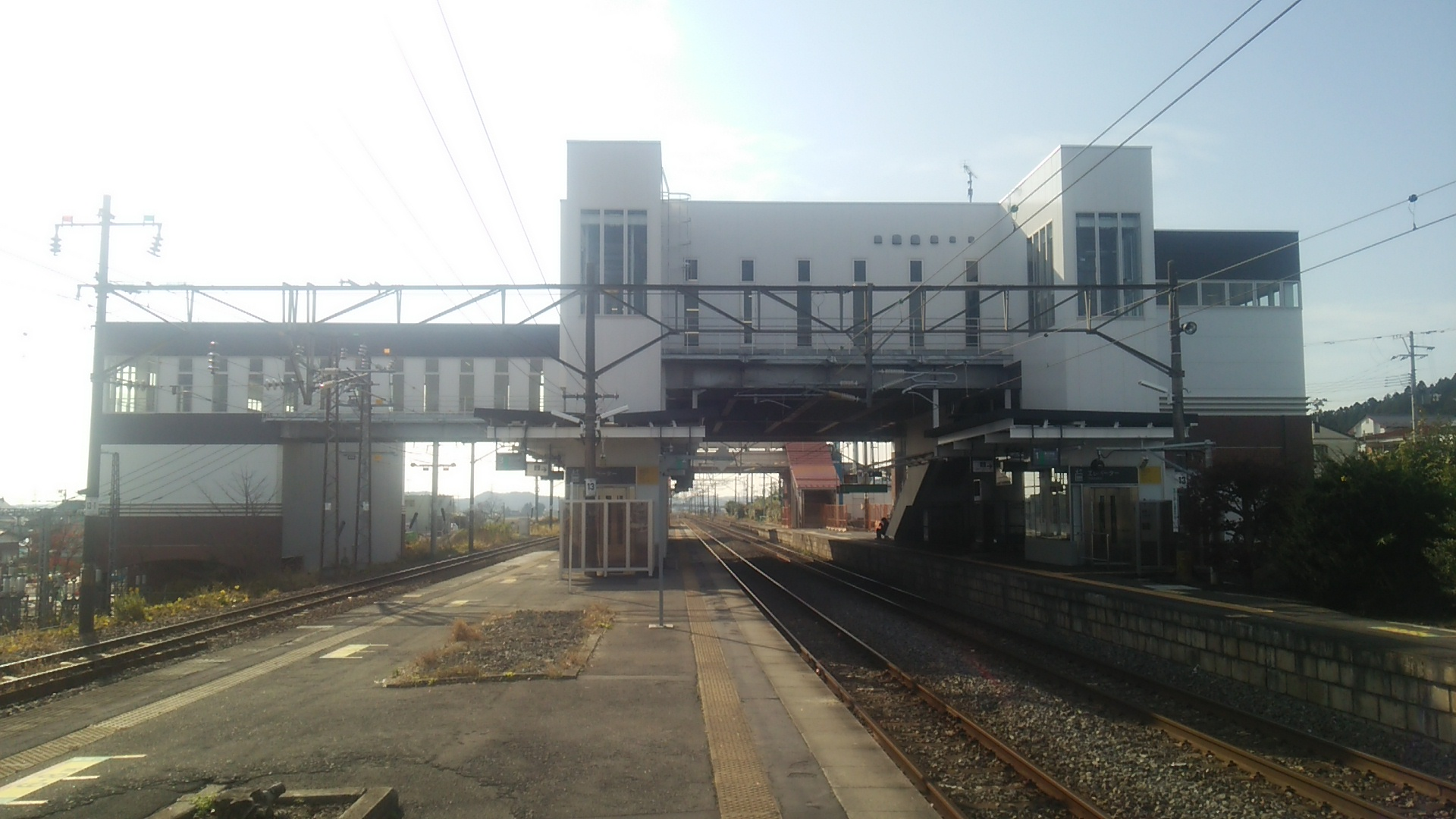
- Kashimadai Station, November 2015

General information
- Location: Kashimadai Hiraneta, Ōsaki-shi, Miyagi-ken 989-4103; Japan
- Coordinates: 38.4747°N 141.0982°E
- Operator: JR East
- Line: ■ Tōhoku Main Line
- Distance: 386.6 km (240.2 mi) from Tokyo
- Platforms: 1 side + 1 island platform
- Tracks: 3

Other information
- Status: Staffed ("Midori no Madoguchi")
- Website: Official website

History
- Opened: March 16, 1892; 134 years ago

Passengers
- FY2018: 1620 daily

Services
| Preceding station | JR East | Following station |
|---|---|---|
| Shinainuma towards Kuroiso | Tōhoku Main Line Local | Matsuyamamachi towards Morioka |
Location
- Location within Miyagi Prefecture Location within Japan

Kashimadai Station (鹿島台駅, Kashimadai-eki) is a railway station in the city of Ōsaki, Miyagi Prefecture, Japan, operated by East Japan Railway Company (JR East).

== Lines ==
Kashimadai Station is served by the Tōhoku Main Line, and is located 386.6 rail kilometers from the official starting point of the line at Tokyo Station.

== Station layout ==
The station has one ground-level side platform and one ground-level island platform connected to the elevated station building by a footbridge. The station has a Midori no Madoguchi staffed ticket office.

=== Platforms ===
| 1 | ■ Tōhoku Main Line | for Kogota and Ichinoseki |
| 2 | ■ Tōhoku Main Line | not in normal use |
| 2 | ■ Tōhoku Main Line | for Matsushima and Sendai |

== History ==
Kashimadai Station opened on March 16, 1892. The station was absorbed into the JR East network upon the privatization of the Japanese National Railways (JNR) on April 1, 1987.

== Passenger statistics ==
In fiscal 2018, the station was used by an average of 1,620 passengers daily (boarding passengers only).

== Surrounding area ==
- National Route 346
- former Kashimadai Town Hall
- Kashimadai Post Office
- Kashimadai Rock Shopping Center

== See also ==
- List of railway stations in Japan
