= Shinainuma Station =

Railway station in Matsushima, Miyagi Prefecture, Japan

Shinainuma Station 品井沼駅
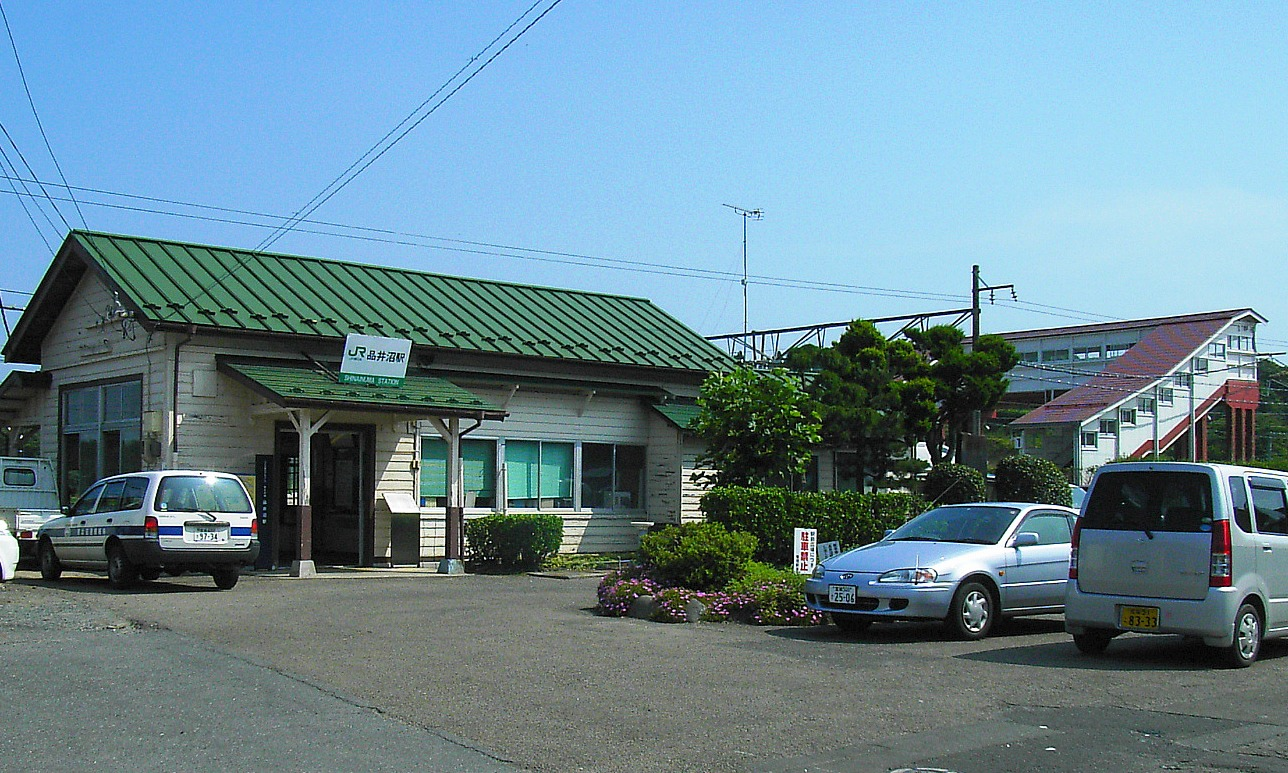
- Shinainuma Station in July 2005

General information
- Location: Hataya Kashimanada 37, Matsushima-cho, Miyagi-gun, Miyagi-ken 981-0205; Japan
- Coordinates: 38.4314°N 141.0825°E
- Operator: JR East
- Line: ■ Tōhoku Main Line
- Distance: 381.6 km from Tokyo
- Platforms: 1 side + 1 island platform
- Tracks: 3

Construction
- Structure type: At grade

Other information
- Status: Staffed
- Website: Official website

History
- Opened: December 26, 1932

Passengers
- FY2018: 296 daily

Services
Preceding station	JR East	Following station
Atago towards Kuroiso	Tōhoku Main Line Local	Kashimadai towards Morioka
Location
- Location within Miyagi Prefecture Location within Japan

Shinainuma Station (品井沼駅, Shinainuma-eki) is a railway station in the town of Matsushima, Miyagi, Japan, operated by East Japan Railway Company (JR East).

== Lines ==
Shinainuma Station is served by the Tōhoku Main Line, and is located 381.6 km from the official starting point of the line at Tokyo Station.

== Station layout ==
The station has one side platform and one island platform connected to the station building by a footbridge. The middle line (Platform 2) is not in use.

=== Platforms ===
1	■ Tohoku Main Line	for Kogota and Ichinoseki
3	■ Tohoku Main Line	for Matsushima and Sendai

== History ==
The station opened on December 26, 1932. The station was absorbed into the JR East network upon the privatization of the Japanese National Railways (JNR) on April 1, 1987.

== Passenger statistics ==
In fiscal 2018, the station was used by an average of 296 passengers daily (boarding passengers only). The passenger figures for previous years are as shown below.

Fiscal year	Daily average
2000	481
2005	387
2010	335
2015	343

== Surrounding area ==
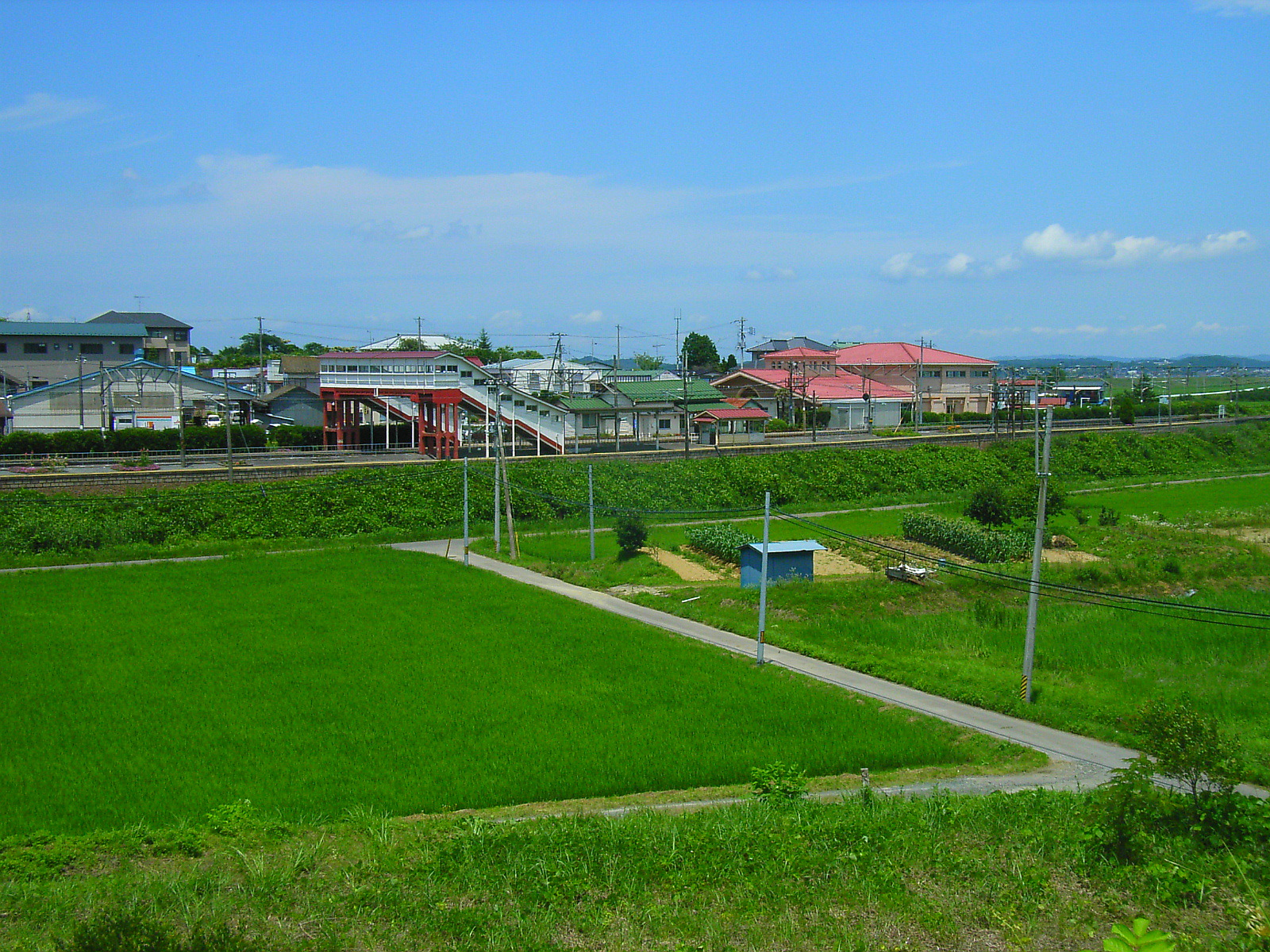
Shinainuma Station and its surroundings

- Shinanuma Post Office
- National Route 346

== See also ==
- List of railway stations in Japan
