= Matsushima =

Group of islands in Miyagi Prefecture, Japan

Coordinates: 38°22′N 141°05′E

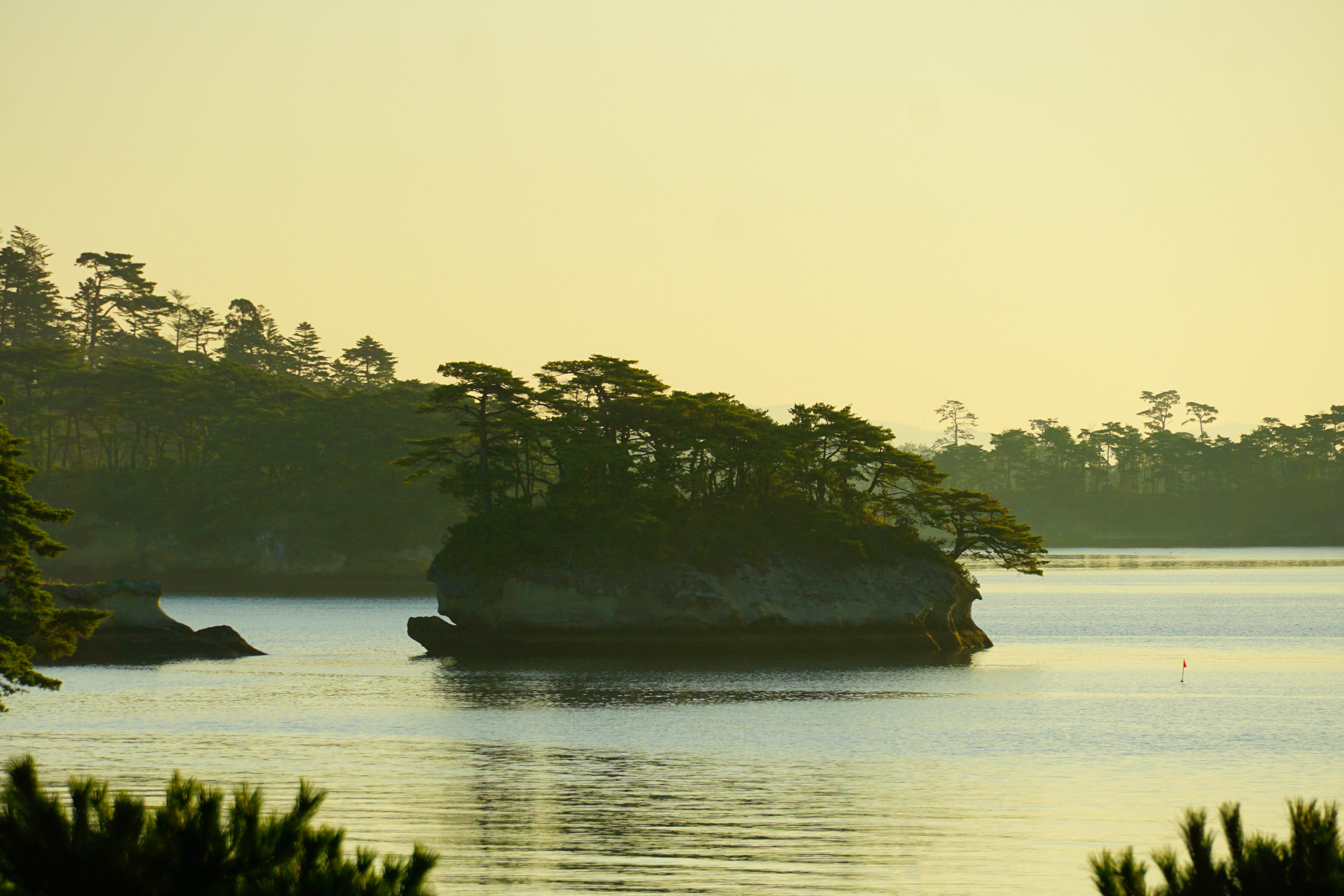
Kameshima

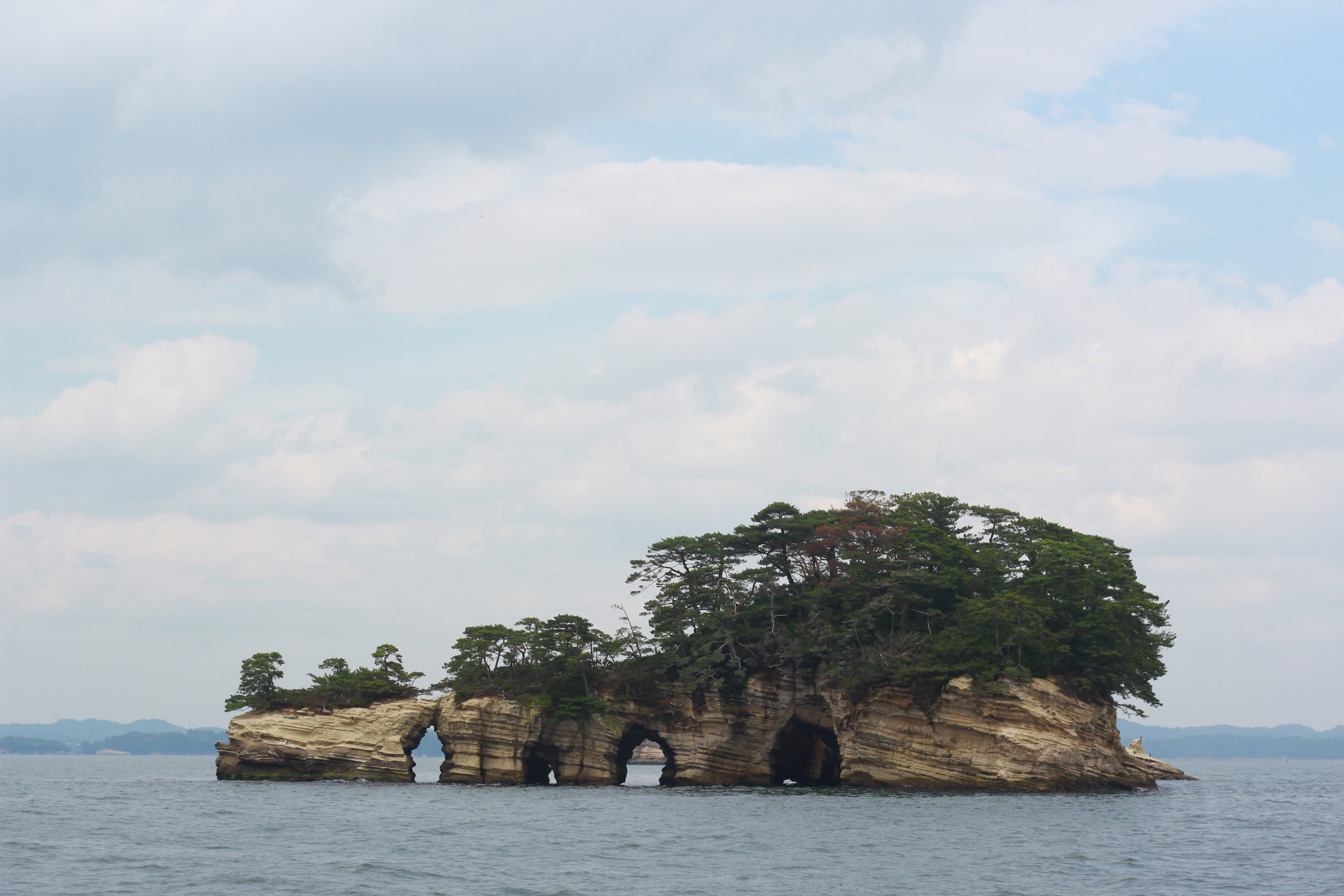
Kanejima, one of the many famous islands that dot the archipelago

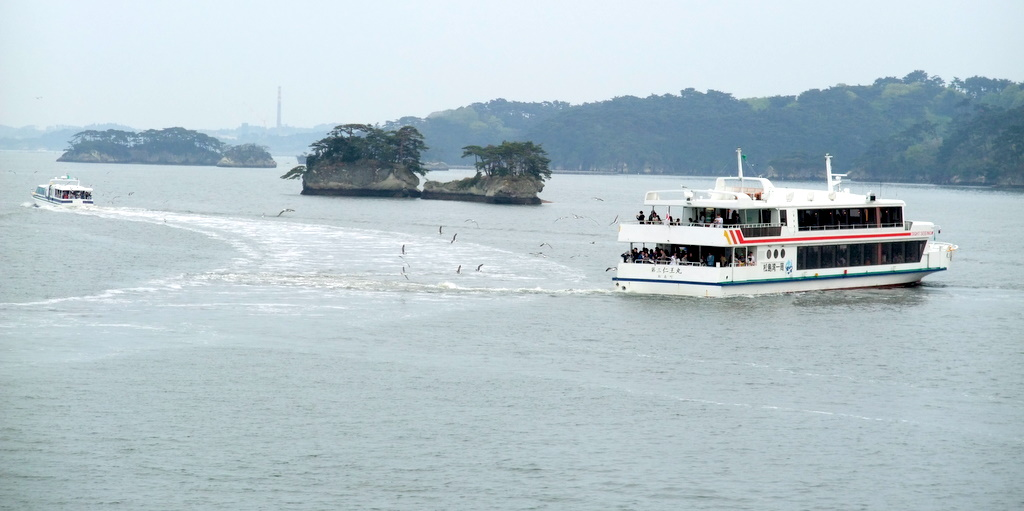
The view from Godaido

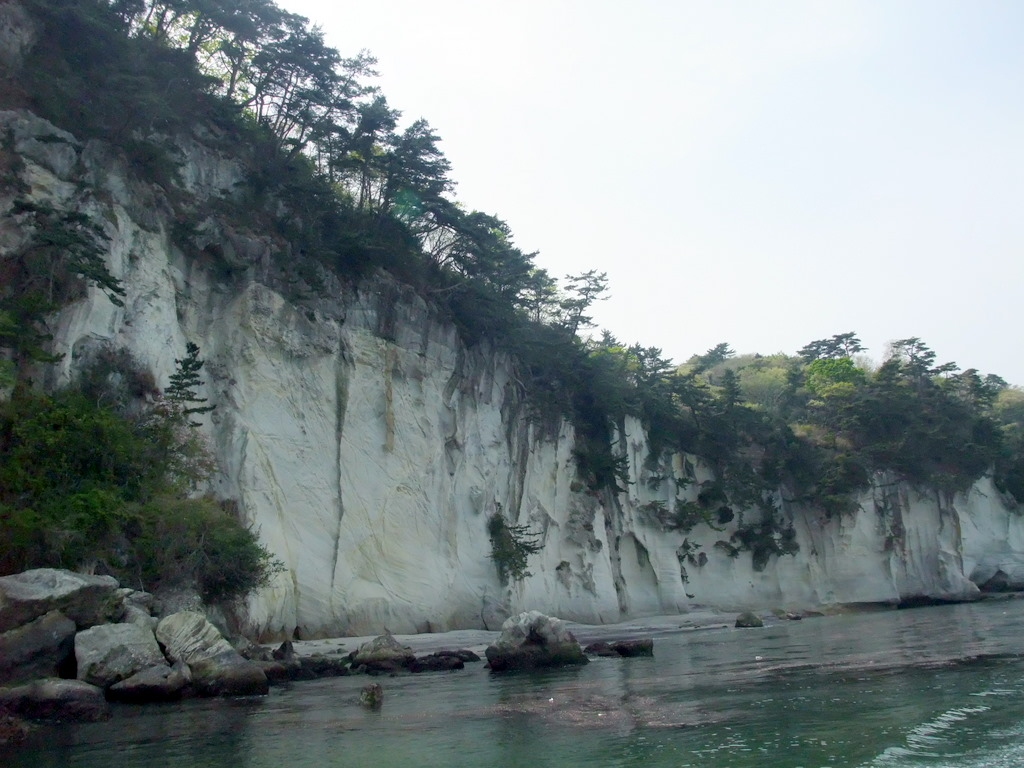
Sagakei at Matsushima

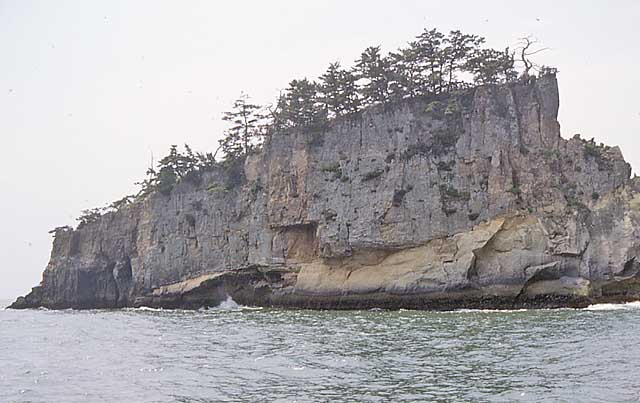
One of the islands of Matsushima

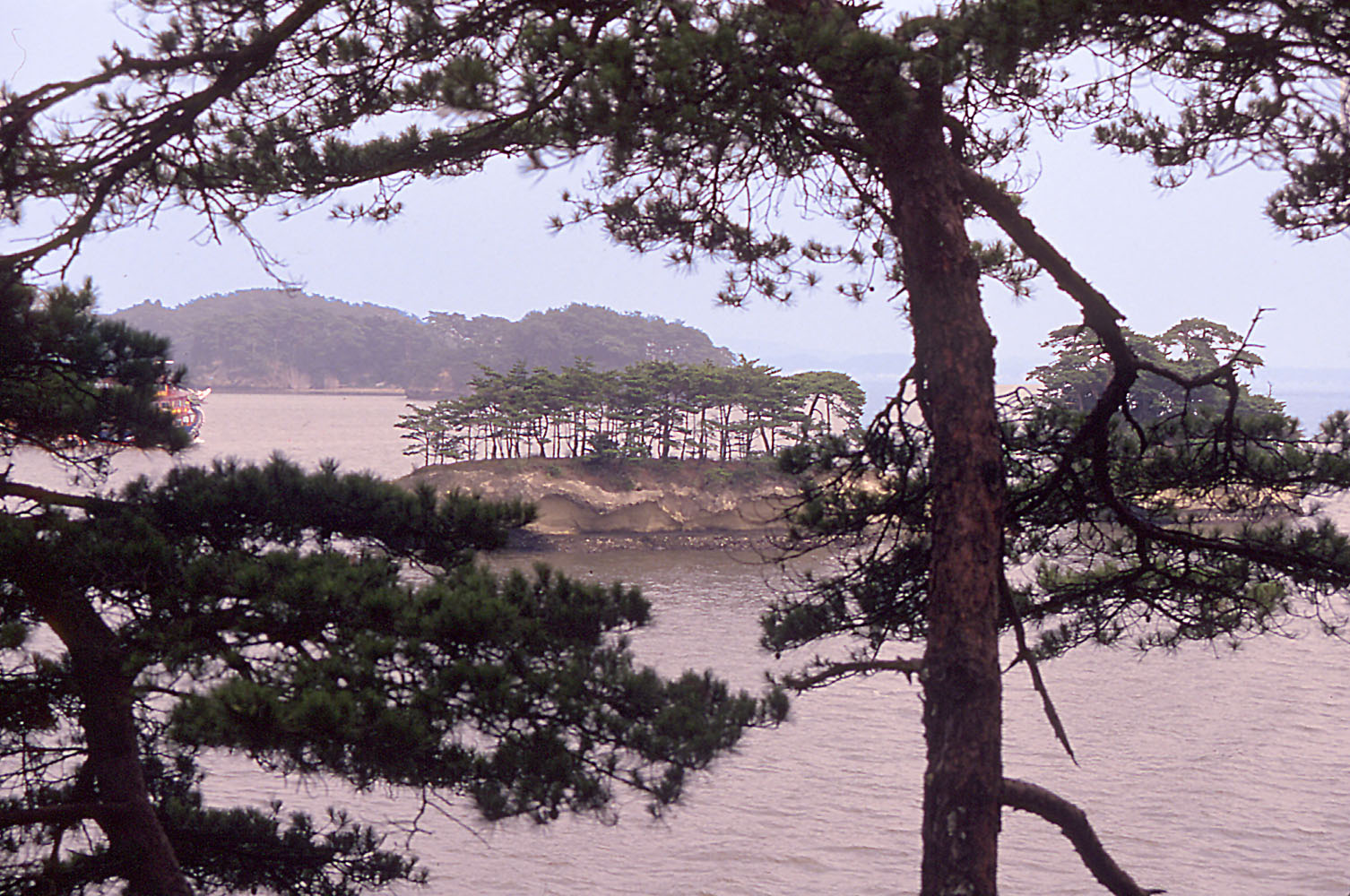
One of the islands of Matsushima

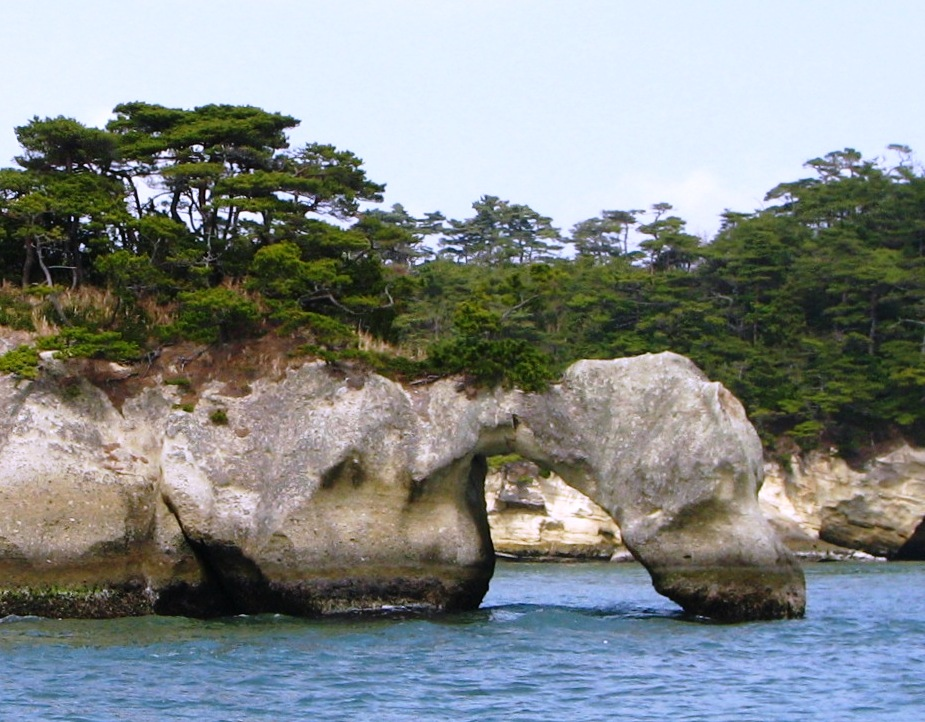
Chōmei-ana in Komonejima, about five meters in height, was known in folklore that people who passed through there in a pleasure boat would live three years longer. However it collapsed in the Sendai earthquake.

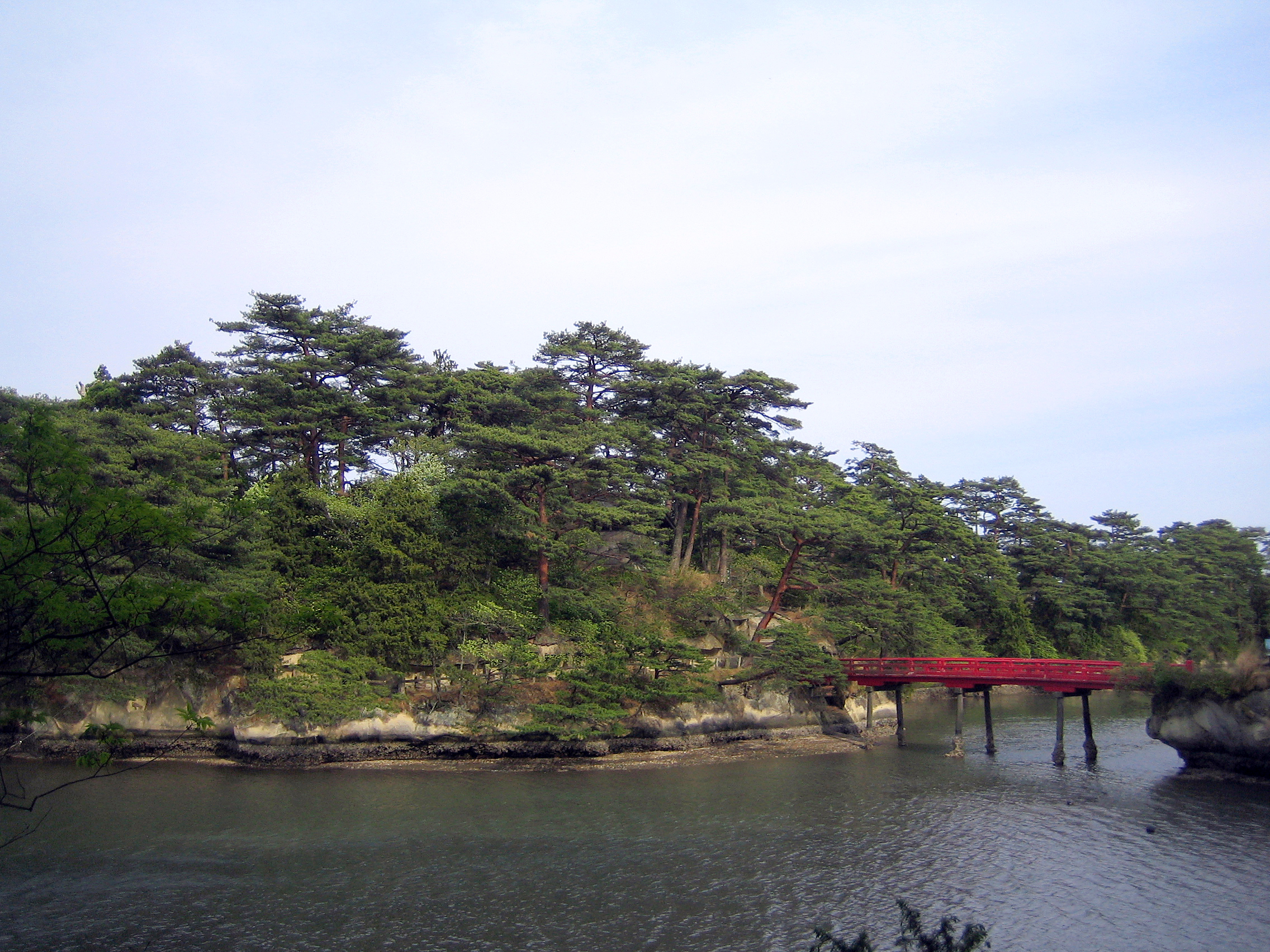
Ojima whose name is Utamakura. The red "Togetsukyō Bridge", about twenty meters in length, was wholly lost in the Sendai earthquake.

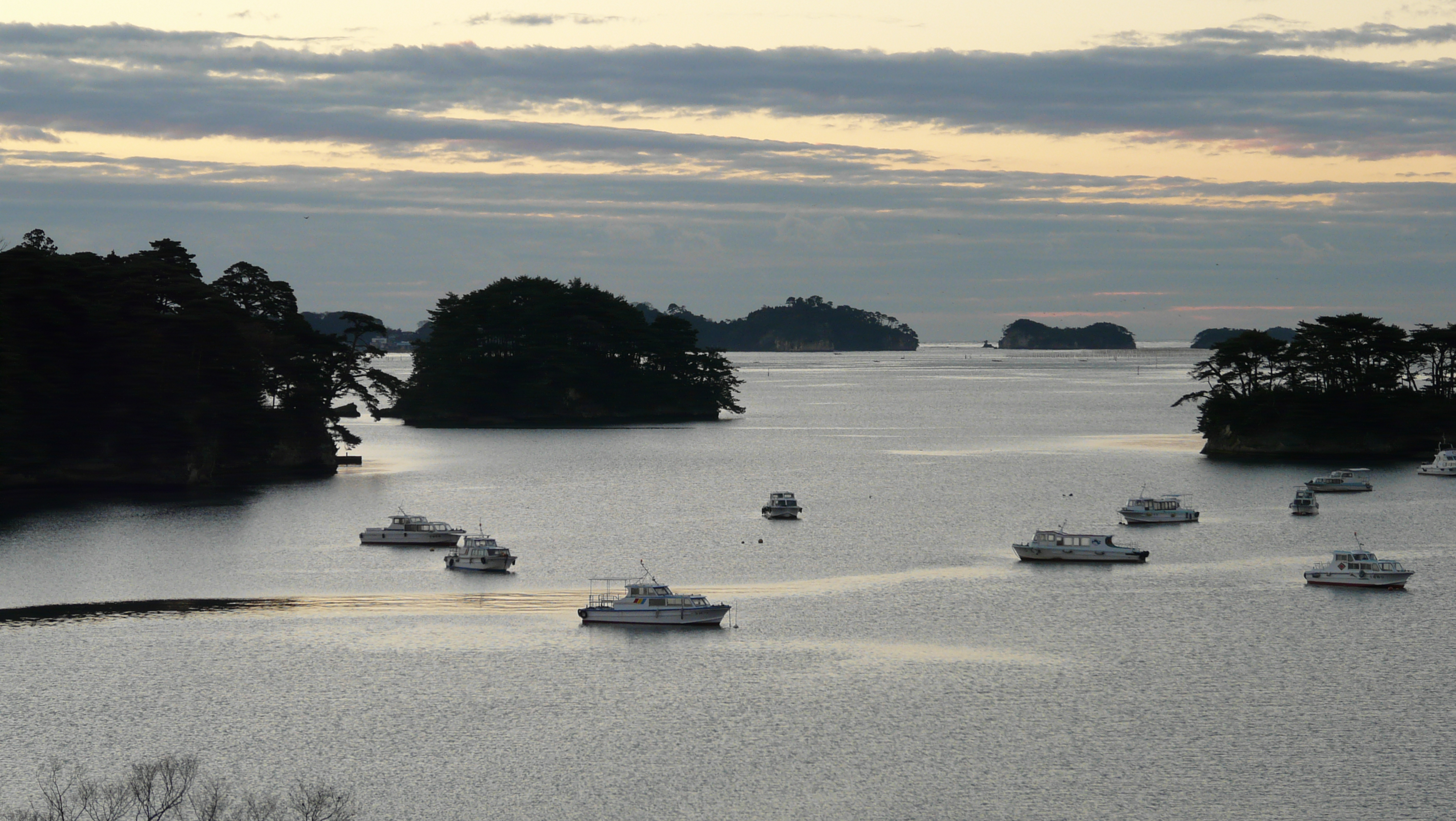
Another view

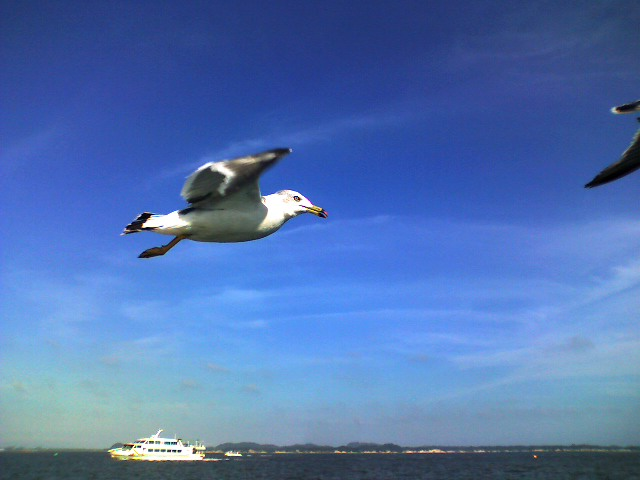
Sea gulls at Matsushima

Matsushima (松島) is a group of islands in Miyagi Prefecture, Japan. There are some 260 tiny islands (shima) covered in pines (matsu) – hence the name – and it is considered to be one of the Three Views of Japan.

Nearby cultural properties include Zuigan-ji, Entsū-in, Kanrantei, and the Satohama shell mound.

== Views ==
A well-known haiku describes the islands as so striking that the poet is at a loss for words:

松島やああ松島や松島や Matsushima ya / aa Matsushima ya / Matsushima ya
Matsushima ah! / A-ah, Matsushima, ah! / Matsushima, ah!

While often attributed to Matsuo Bashō, the earliest known publication is in the Matsushima Zushi (松島図誌), published in 1820 over a century after Bashō's death, which attributes it to the kyōka poet Tawara-bō (田原坊). While Bashō did visit Matsushima in Oku no Hosomichi, its only haiku about Matsushima was written by his travel comparison Kawai Sora.

=== Four views of Matsushima ===
There are four well-known spots to view the Matsushima, known as the Magnificent View (壮観, sōkan), Beautiful View (麗観, reikan), Enchanting View (幽観, yūkan), and Grand View (偉観, ikan).

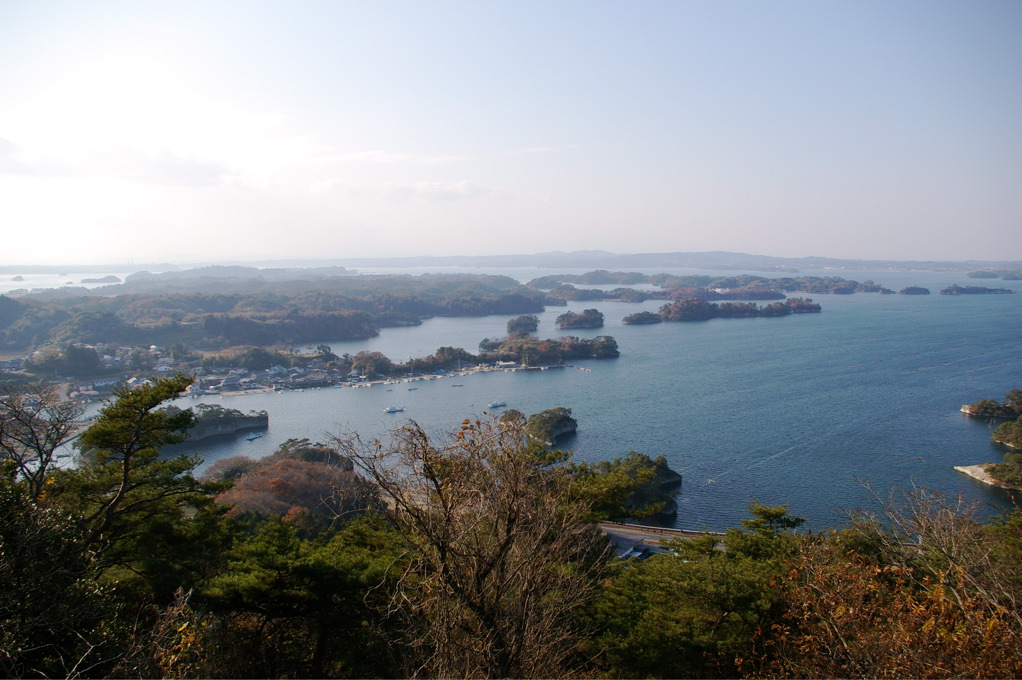
Magnificent View: The view from Otakamori

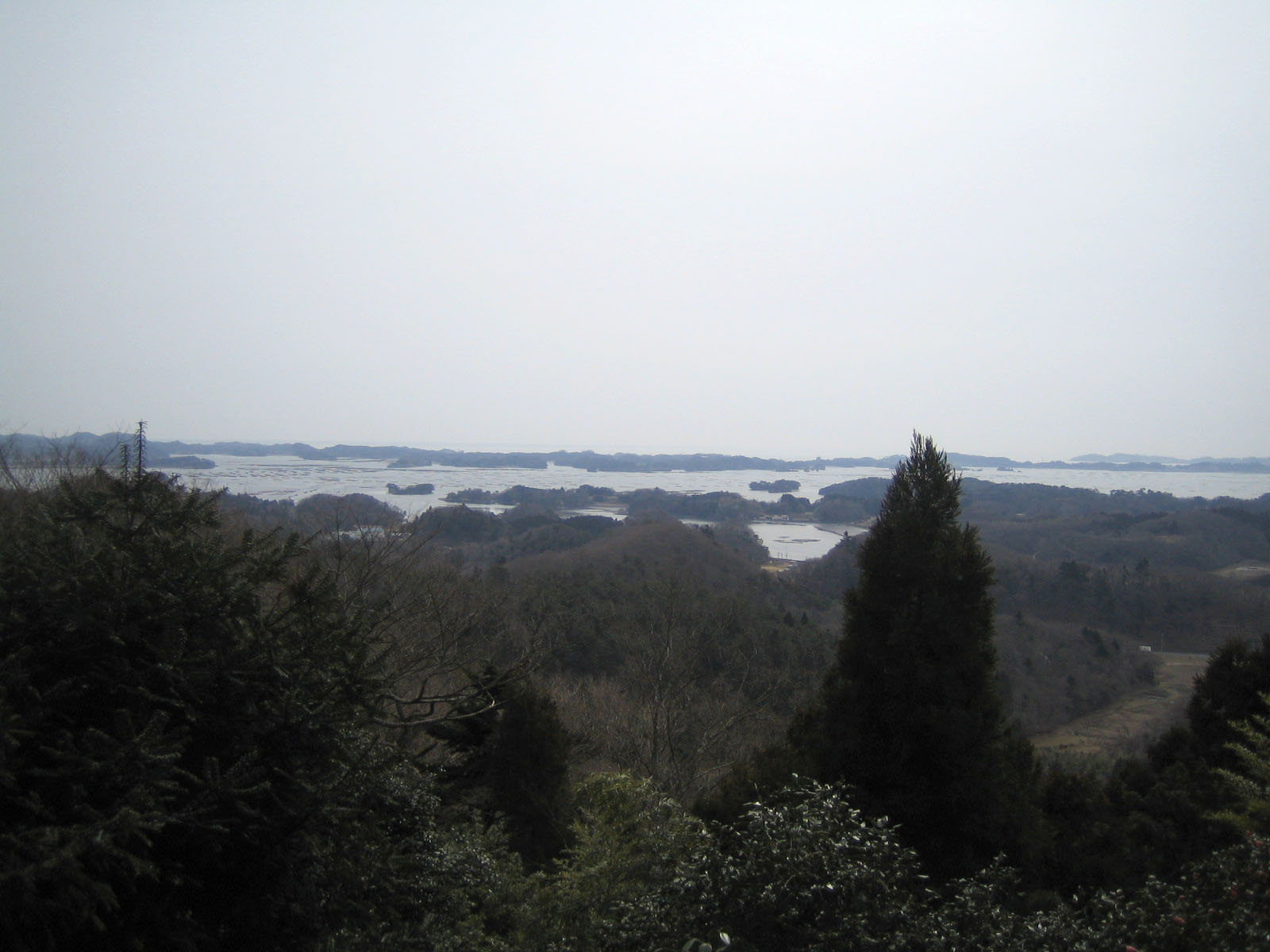
Beautiful View: The view from Tomiyama

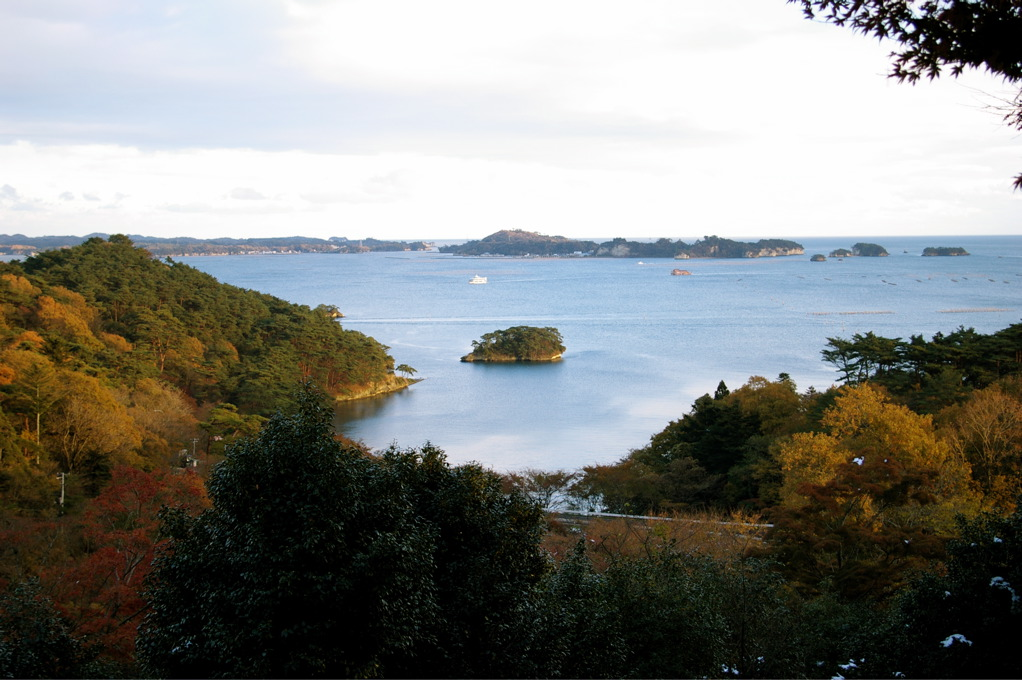
Enchanting View: The view from Ogitani

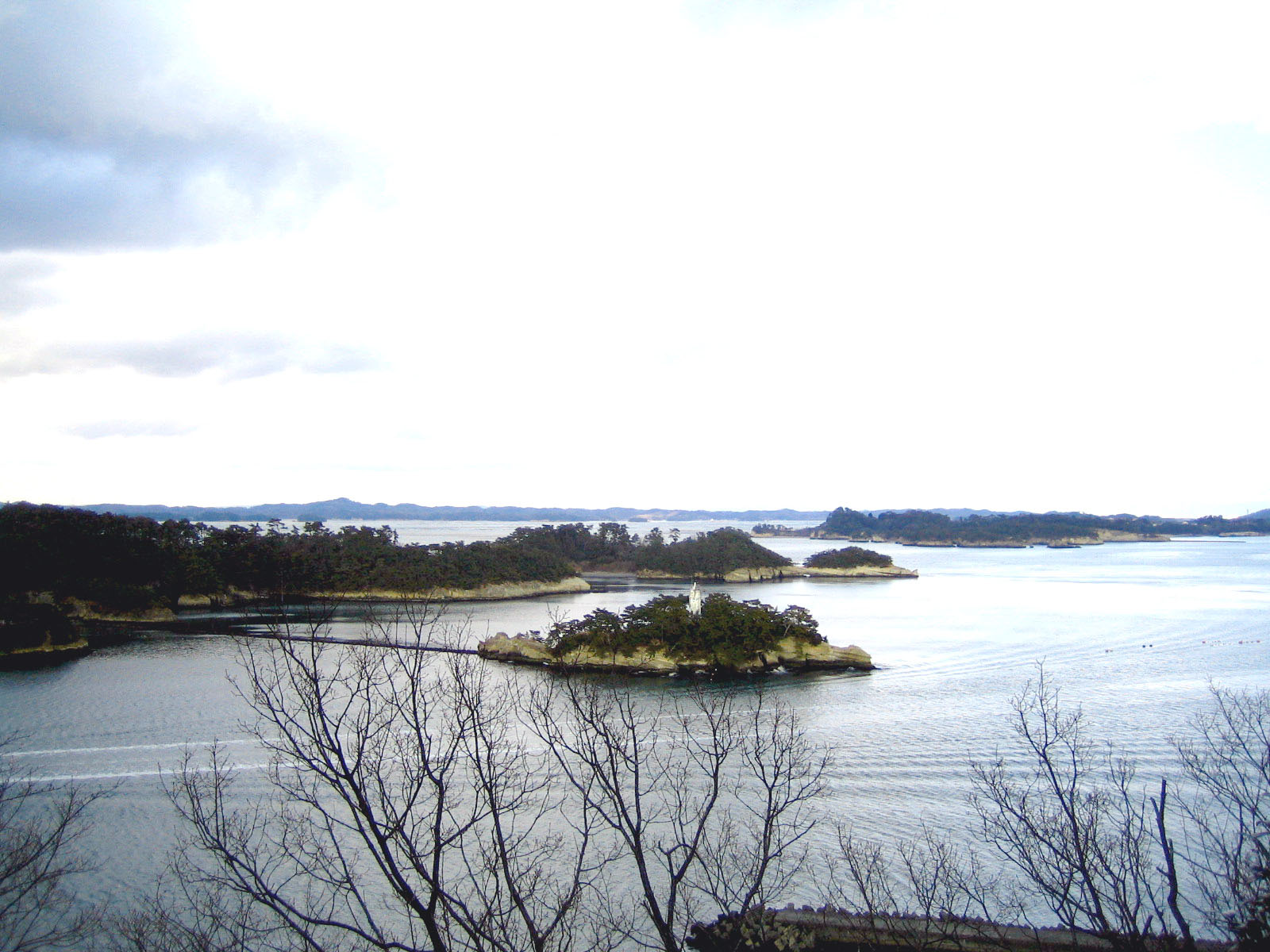
Grand View: The view from Tamonzan

=== Cruise ===
Tourists can view the islands from up close on cruise boats.

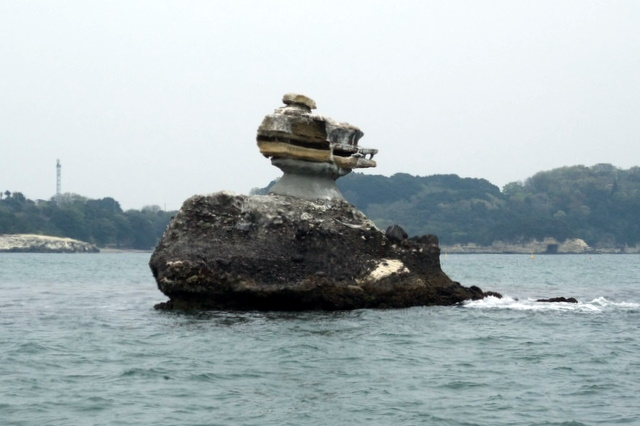
Niōjima

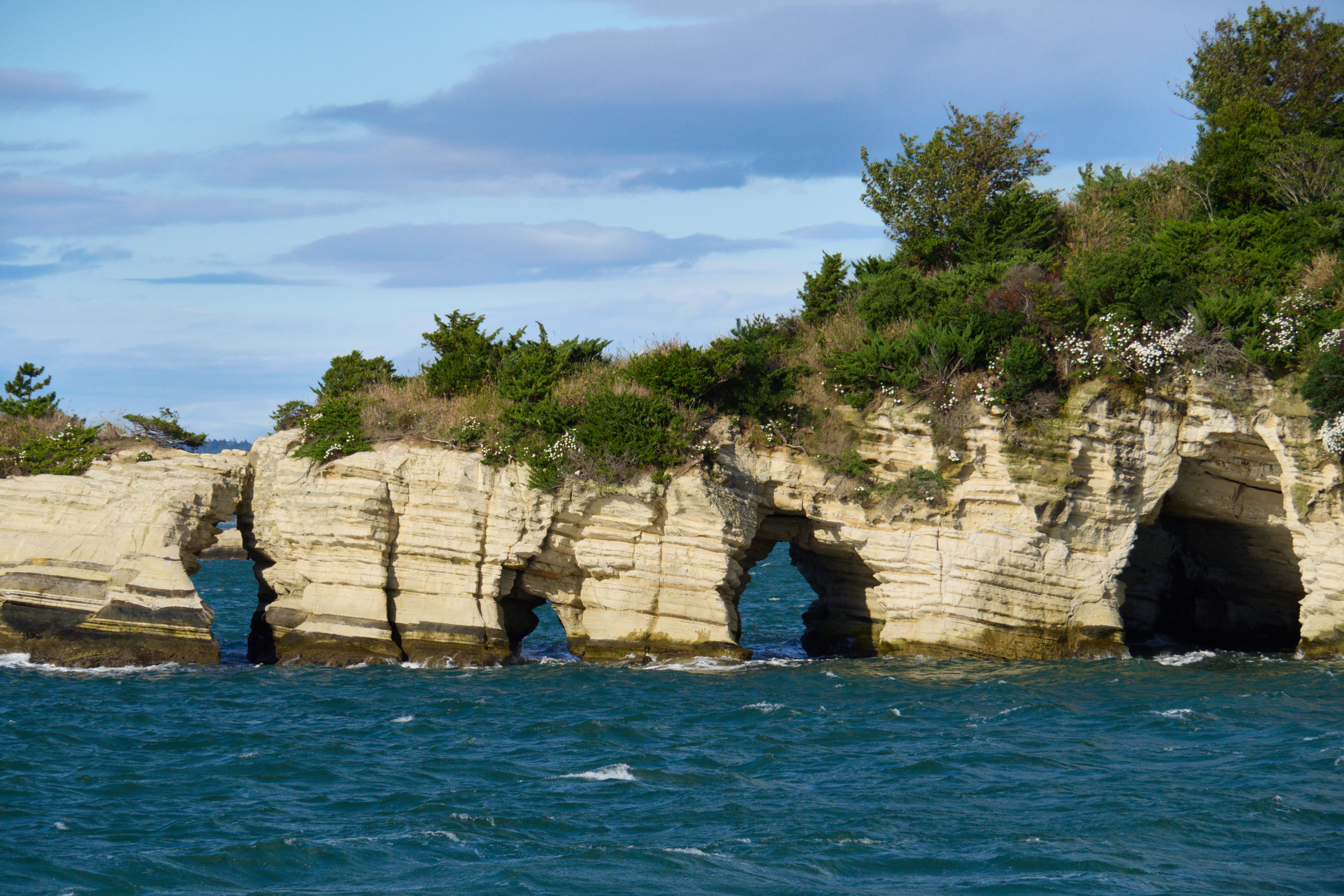
Kanejima, up close

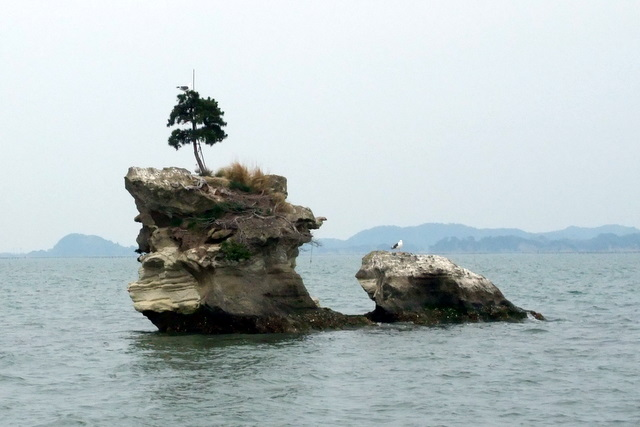
Senganjima: Masamune Date's favorite island

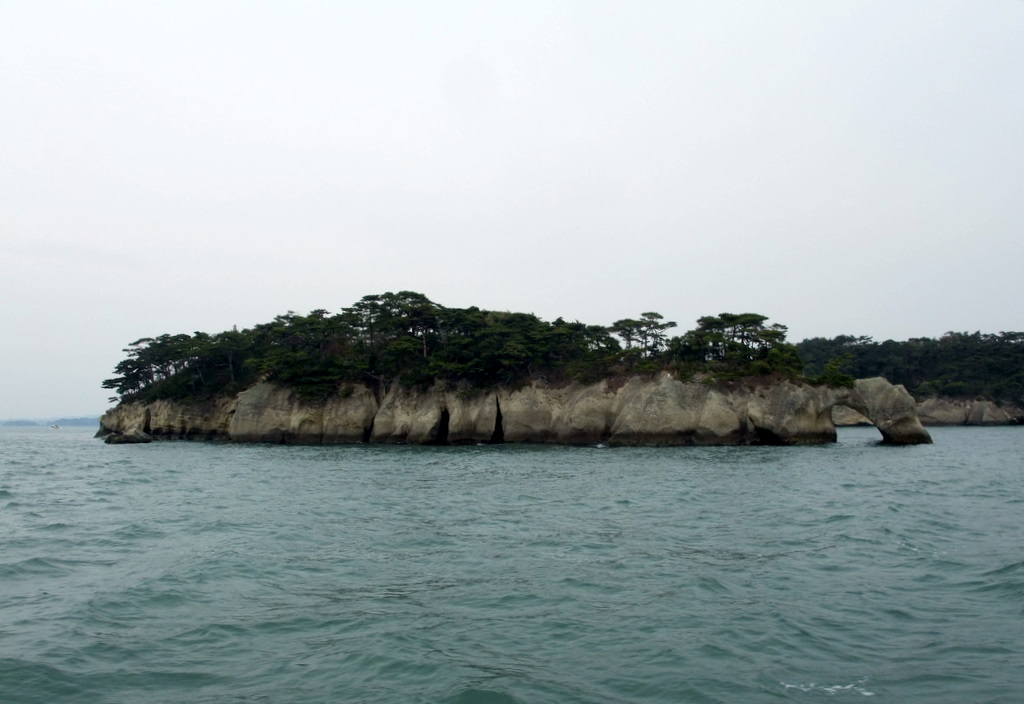
Komonejima

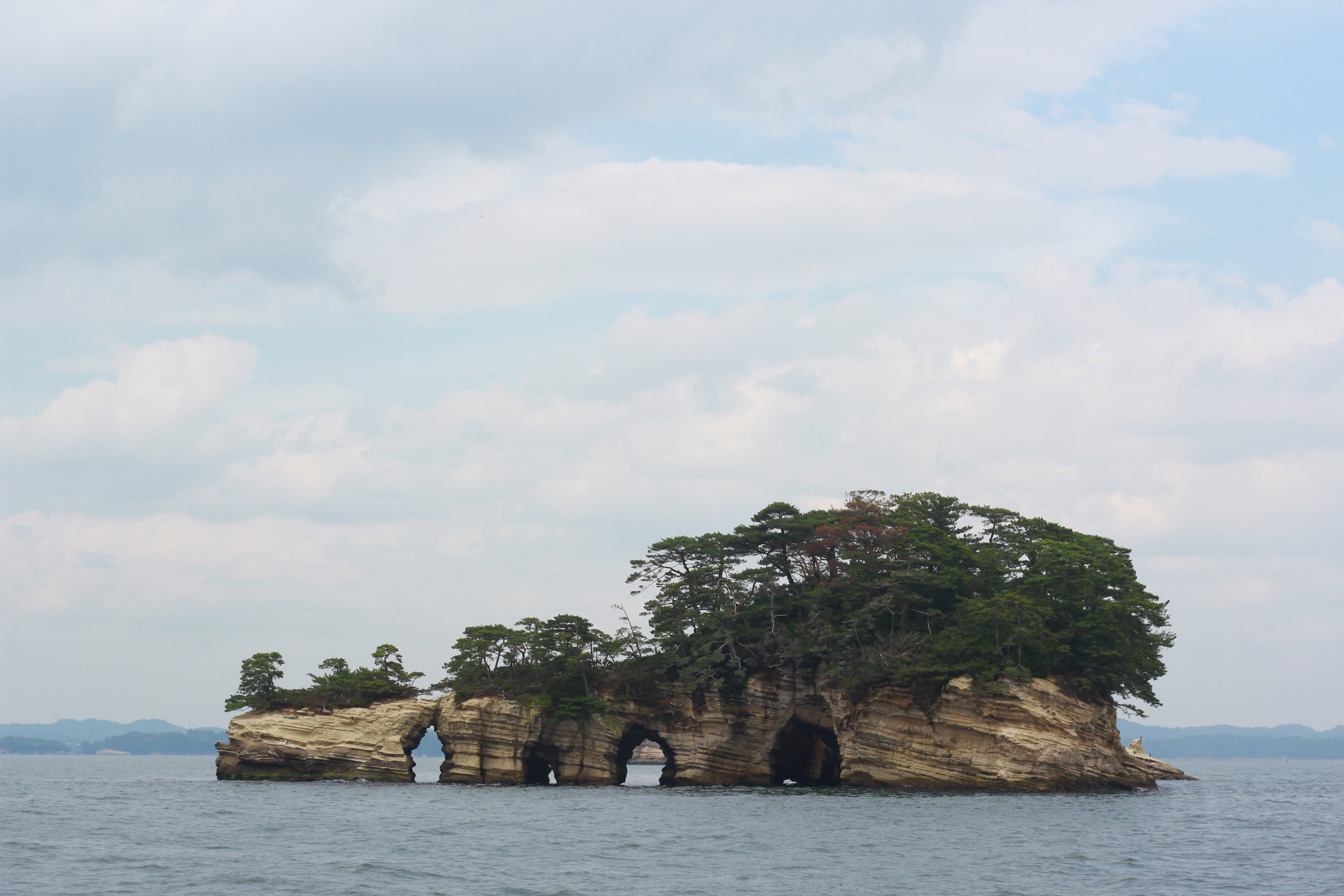
Kanejima

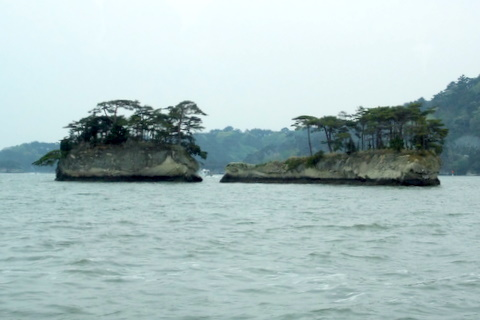
Futagojima

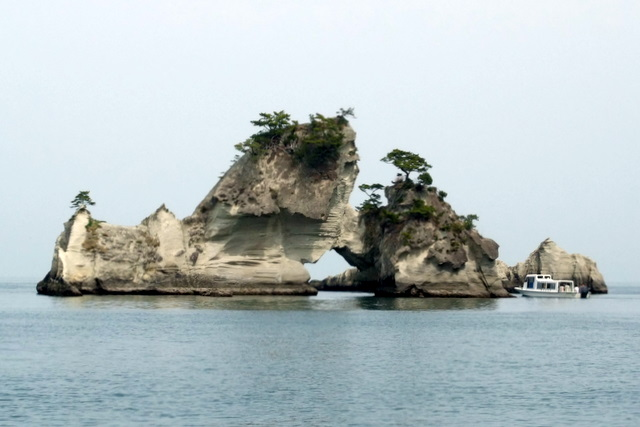
Misagojima

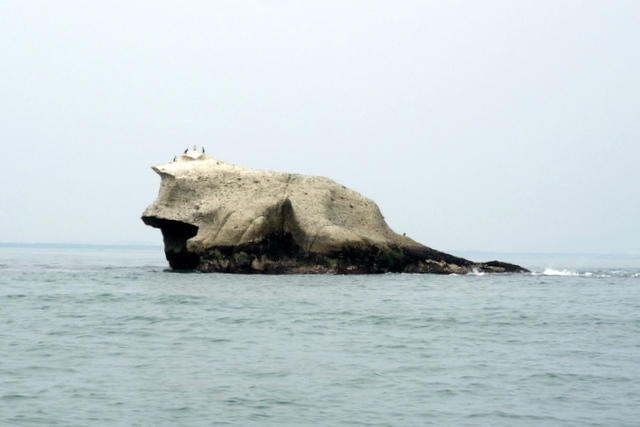
Kaerujima

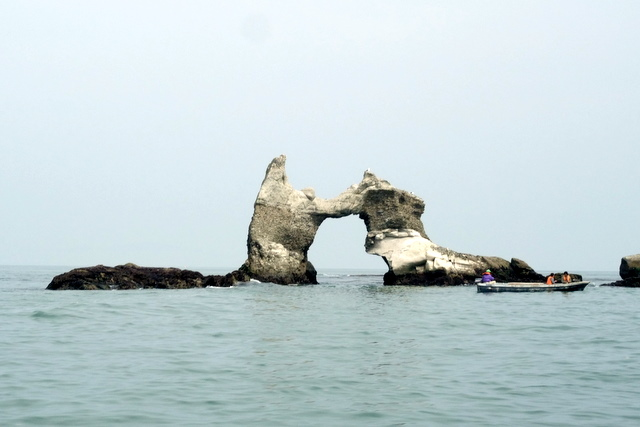
Takashima, also known as Meganejima

(video) Several islands in 2008 before the Tōhoku earthquake changed their appearance.

== Transportation ==
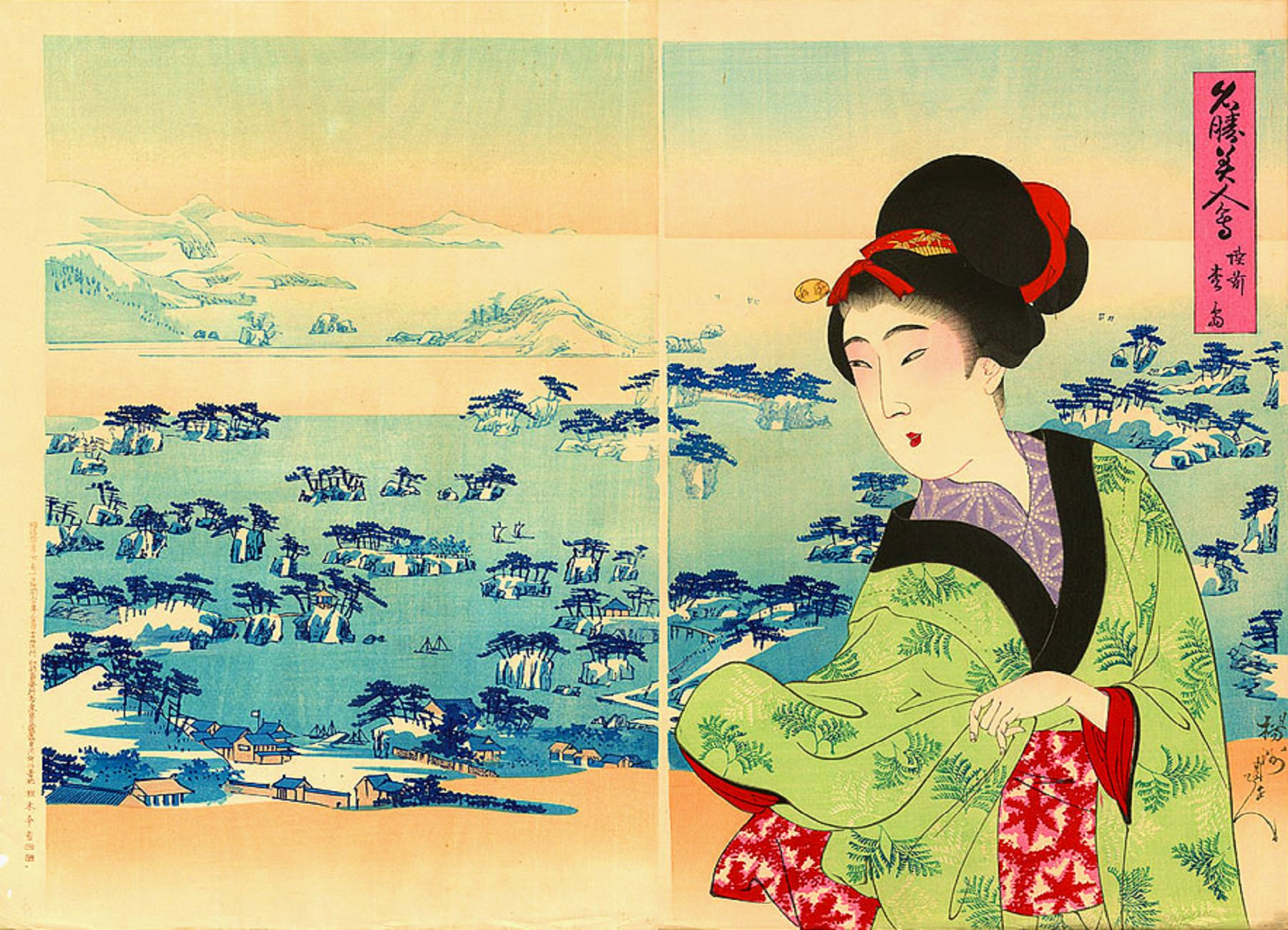
Scenic view of Matsushima. Ukiyo-e woodblock print by Yōshū Chikanobu, 1898

The town is only a short distance (thirty minutes, about 14 km) from prefectural capital Sendai and is easily accessible by train. Matsushima-Kaigan Station is near the attractions such as Zuiganji and the waterfront. Matsushima Station, on a separate line is on the opposite side of the town.

== 2011 Tōhoku earthquake ==
Despite the proximity of Matsushima to the 2011 Tōhoku earthquake and tsunami, the area was protected by the islands and suffered relatively little damage. The initial tsunami was 3.2 metres (10.5 feet), and the second was 3.8 metres (12.5 feet). Electricity was restored by March 18, water fully restored by April 16 and the Senseki Train Line between Takagimachi Station and Sendai by May 28. Nevertheless, three people were confirmed killed in Matsushima (including by aftershocks), with 18 killed while out of town.

== Activities ==
Around the island travelers can go on a cruise and view the islands up close, and around the Matsushima shore travelers can rent bikes.

== See also ==
- List of Special Places of Scenic Beauty, Special Historic Sites and Special Natural Monuments
