= Zuigan-ji =

Buddhist temple in Matsushima, Miyagi, Japan

- 瑞巌寺
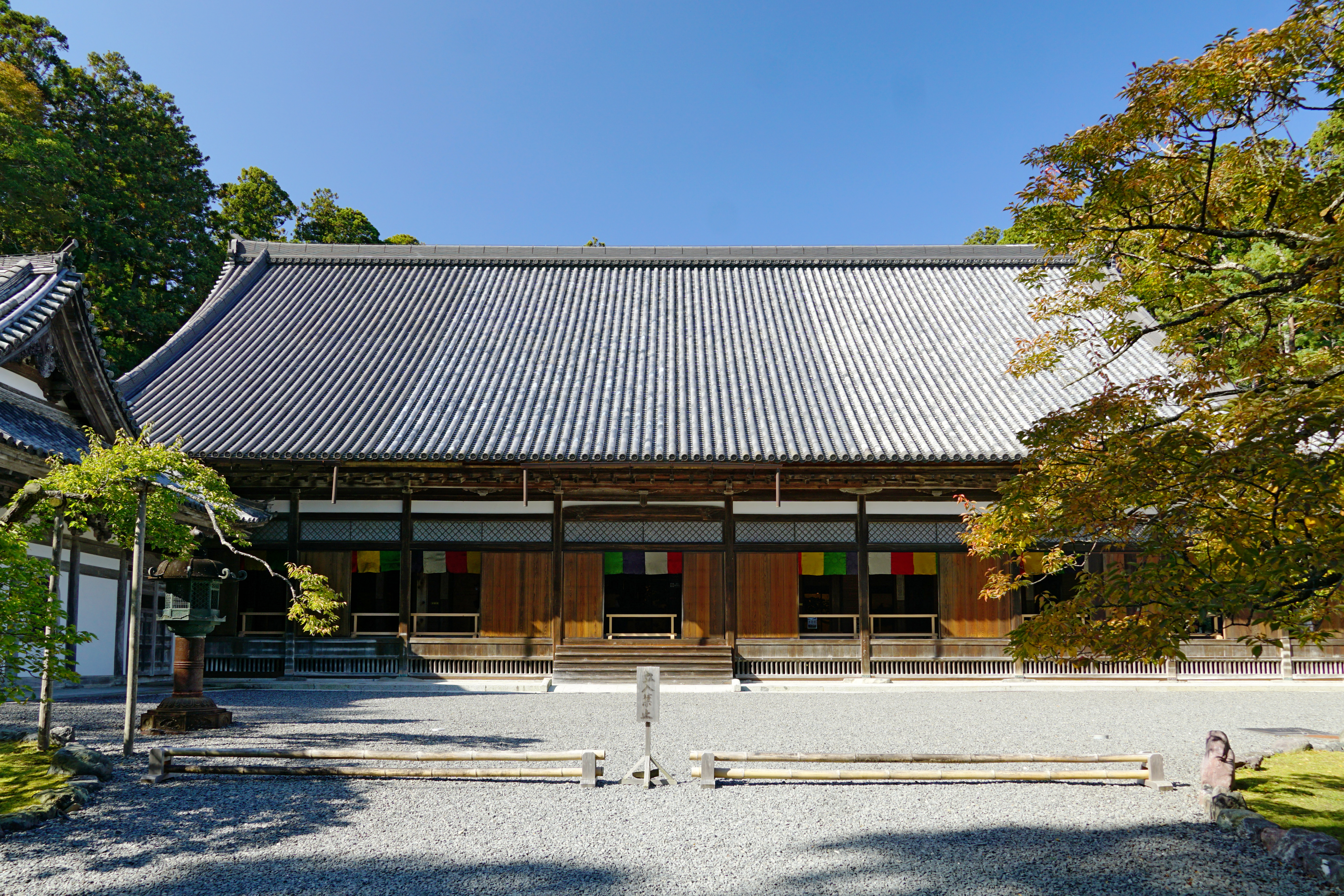
- Hondō (the main hall), a National Treasure

- Location within Miyagi Prefecture Location within Japan

Religion
- Affiliation: Buddhist
- Deity: Shō Kannon Bosatsu
- Rite: Rinzai Zen, Myōshin-ji school
- Status: active

Location
- Location: 91 Matsushima Chōnai, Matsushima-chō, Miyagi-gun, Miyagi-ken
- Country: Japan
- Coordinates: 38°22′20″N 141°03′35″E

Architecture
- Founder: Ennin
- Completed: 828

Website
- Official website (in Japanese)
- National Treasure National Important Cultural Property

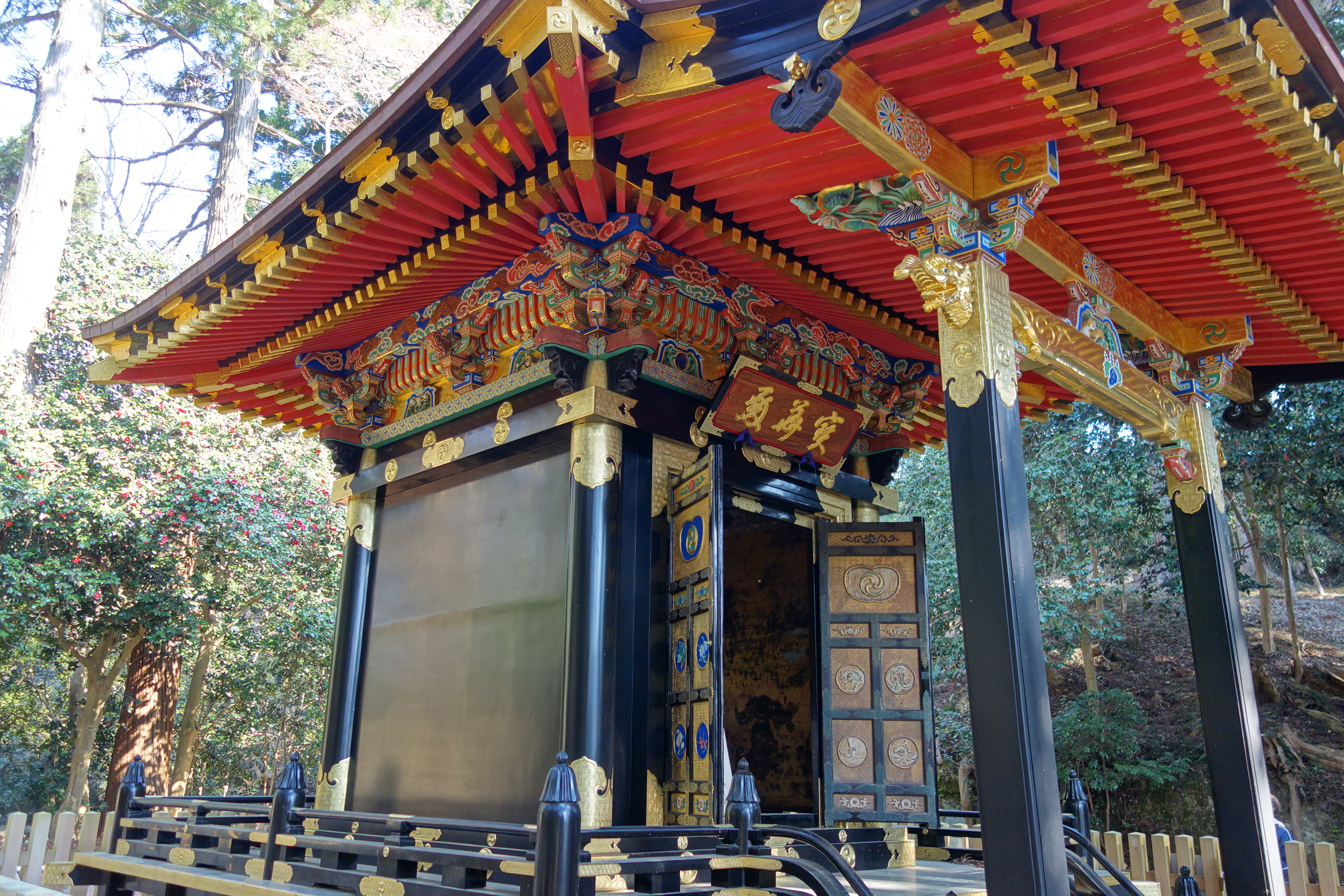
Mausoleum for Date Masamune's wife

Zuigan-ji (瑞巌寺, Zuigan-ji) is a Buddhist temple in located in the town of Matsushima, Miyagi Prefecture, Japan. Belonging to the Myōshin-ji branch of Rinzai school of Japanese Zen, its honzon is a statue of Shō Kannon Bosatsu. The temple's full name is Shōtō Seiryūzan Zuigan Enpuku Zenji (松島青龍山瑞巌円福禅寺), but it was commonly known as "Matsushima-dera". It was founded in 828 during the Heian period by Jikaku Daishi. In commemoration of the haiku poet Matsuo Basho's pilgrimage in 1689 during the early Edo period, the Basho Festival is held annually at the temple on the second Sunday of November.

== History ==
The temple claims to have founded as a Tendai sect temple by order of Emperor Junna in 828 in the Heian period. However, written records from this time are scarce, and this legend relies on the Nanboku-chō period Tendai-ki as evidence. During the late Nara period and early Heian period, after the establishment of a centralized government under the Ritsuryō system, the imperial court sent a number of military expeditions to what is now the Tōhoku region of northern Japan to bring the local Emishi tribes under its control. Numerous temples were built in the region at this time, many of which are attributed to Jikaku Daishi. The Tendai-ki further states that the temple was patronised by the Northern Fujiwara clan. Priests from Zuigan-ji met with Minamoto no Yoshitsune, and later with Minamoto no Yoritomo during the Battle of Ōshū to destroy the Northern Fujiwara at Hiraizumi. The temple also houses a letter claiming to be from Hojo Masako addressed to the monk Kenbutsu, along with a Buddhist relic donated by Masako, encased in a stupa-shaped crystal container, both of which are of questionable authenticity. However, what is known from archaeological evidence is that in the Heian period the site of the current temple was a salt furnace, thus it was impossible for a temple to have existed at this location at that time.

During the Kamakura period, under Hōjō Tokimune, the temple changed from Tendai to Rinzai Zen, with Rankei Dōryū has its head priest and came to a patronised by the samurai class. Both the Tendai-ki and Zen-sect records give dramatic accounts of this conversion, which involved the use of military force and the violent expulsion of the Tendai monks from the temple. As a Zen temple, it was initially ranked as one of the Kantō Jissetsu. However, a fire left the temple in ruins by the end of the Sengoku period. Around 1573, under the 93rd abbot, Jitsudo, the temple became affiliated with the Myoshinji school of the Rinzai sect. During the Edo period, it was rebuilt by Date Masamune from 1604 to 1609 using lumber brought from Mount Kumano in what is now Wakayama Prefecture and skilled workmen from Kyoto and Kii Province. The temple's surviving buildings from that reconstruction reflect the flamboyant Momoyama style. In the Edo period the temple flourished under the protection of the Date clan, successive daimyō of Sendai Domain. A theory exists that the temple was reconstructed to be Date Masamune's hidden fortress, and as Date Masamune planned to invite the Emperor to Zuigan-ji once he overthrew the Tokugawa shogunate, he constructed a room called the Kamijodan no Ma, where the Emperor could place his throne.

Following the Meiji restoration, most of the temple's territory was confiscated by the Meiji government, and with the loss of income, many of its buildings fell into disrepair and were eventually lost. However, in 1918 the Crown Prince (the future Emperor Taisho) visited the temple and in 1947, Emperor Hirohito also made a visit. The Main Hall, which was completed in 1609, was designated a National Treasure in 1953, and the temple many other cultural assets, including buildings. A museum opened in 1974 and houses approximately 30,000 items, including artifacts unearthed during excavations. Major repairs to the temple buildings were conducted from 2008 to 2018. Due to its protected location in Matsushima Bay, the temple escaped severe damage during the 2011 Tōhoku earthquake and tsunami, although there was some damage to the gardens.

The temple is five minutes on foot from Matsushima-Kaigan Station on the JR East Senseki Line, 20 minutes on foot from Matsushima Station on the JR Tohoku Main Line.

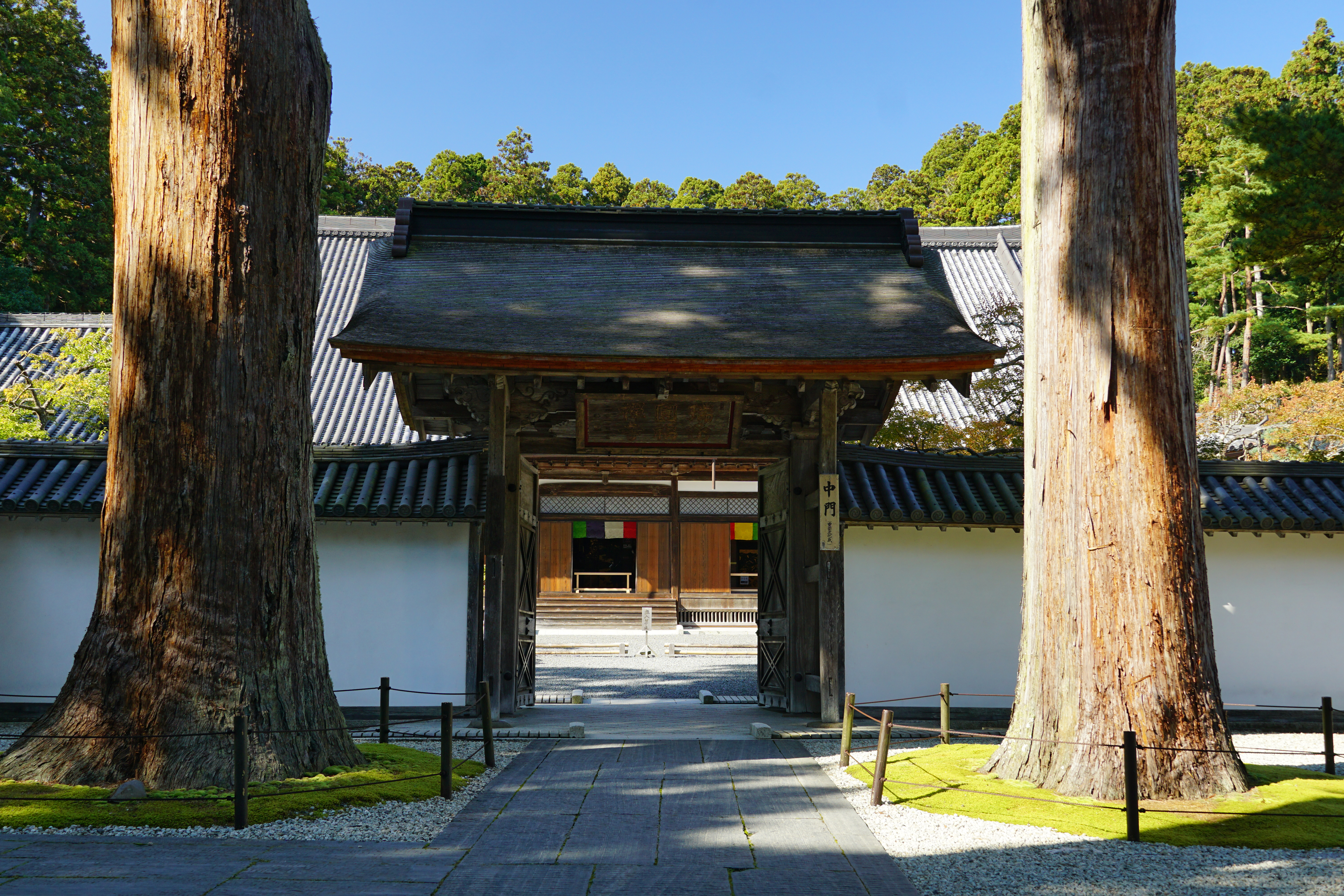
Middle Gate（ICP）

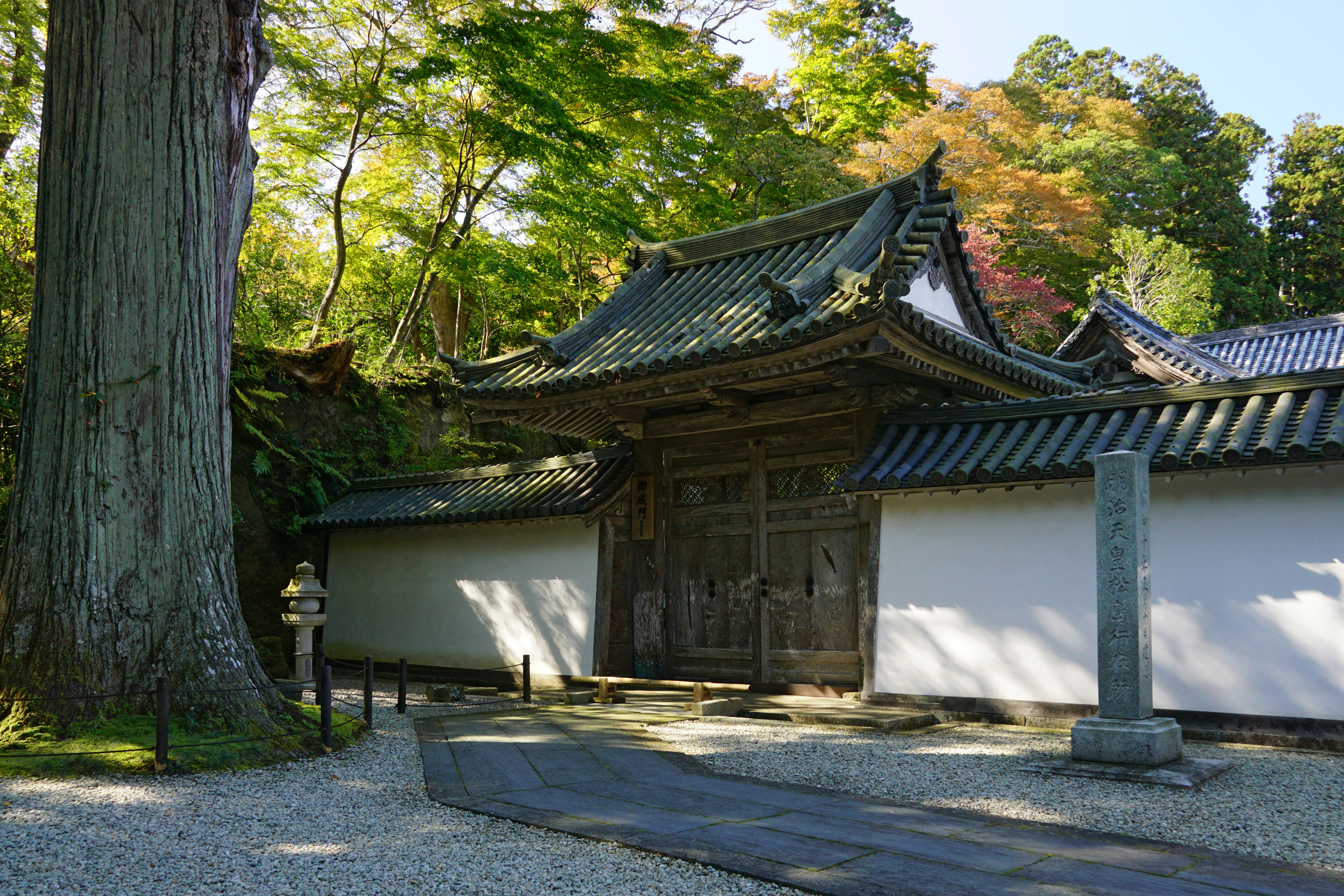
Onarimon（P.ICP）

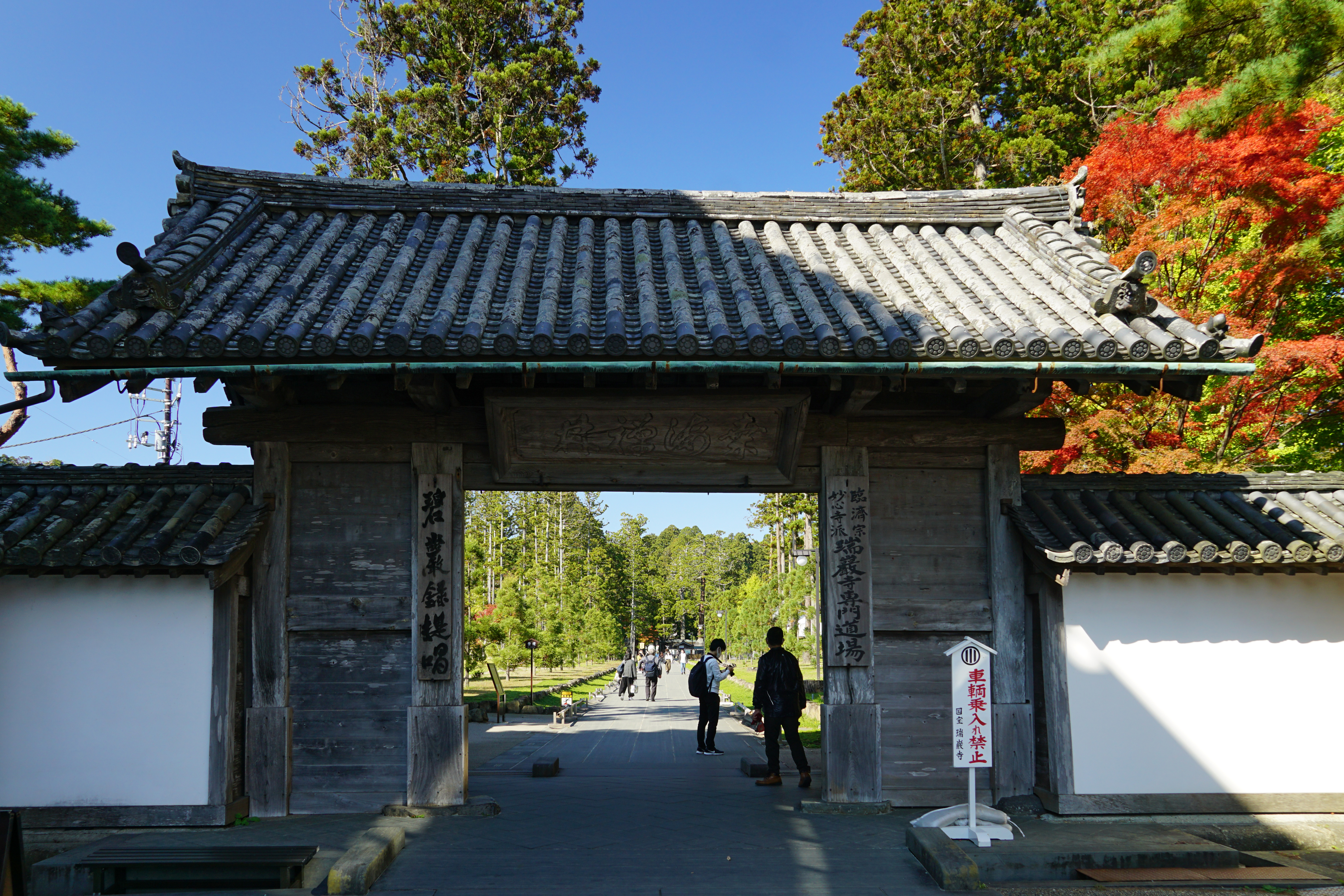
Sōmon（P.ICP）

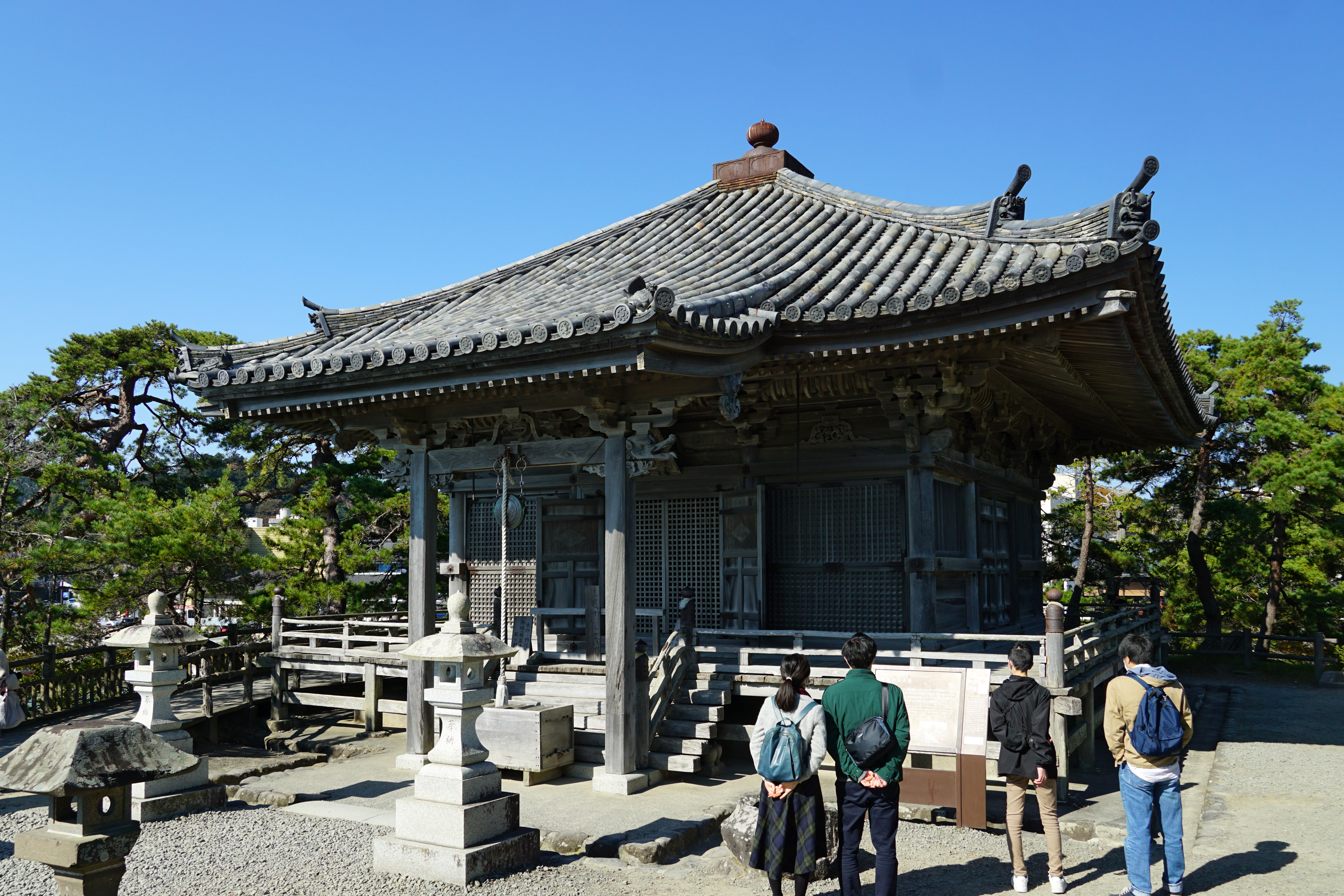
Godai-dō（ICP）

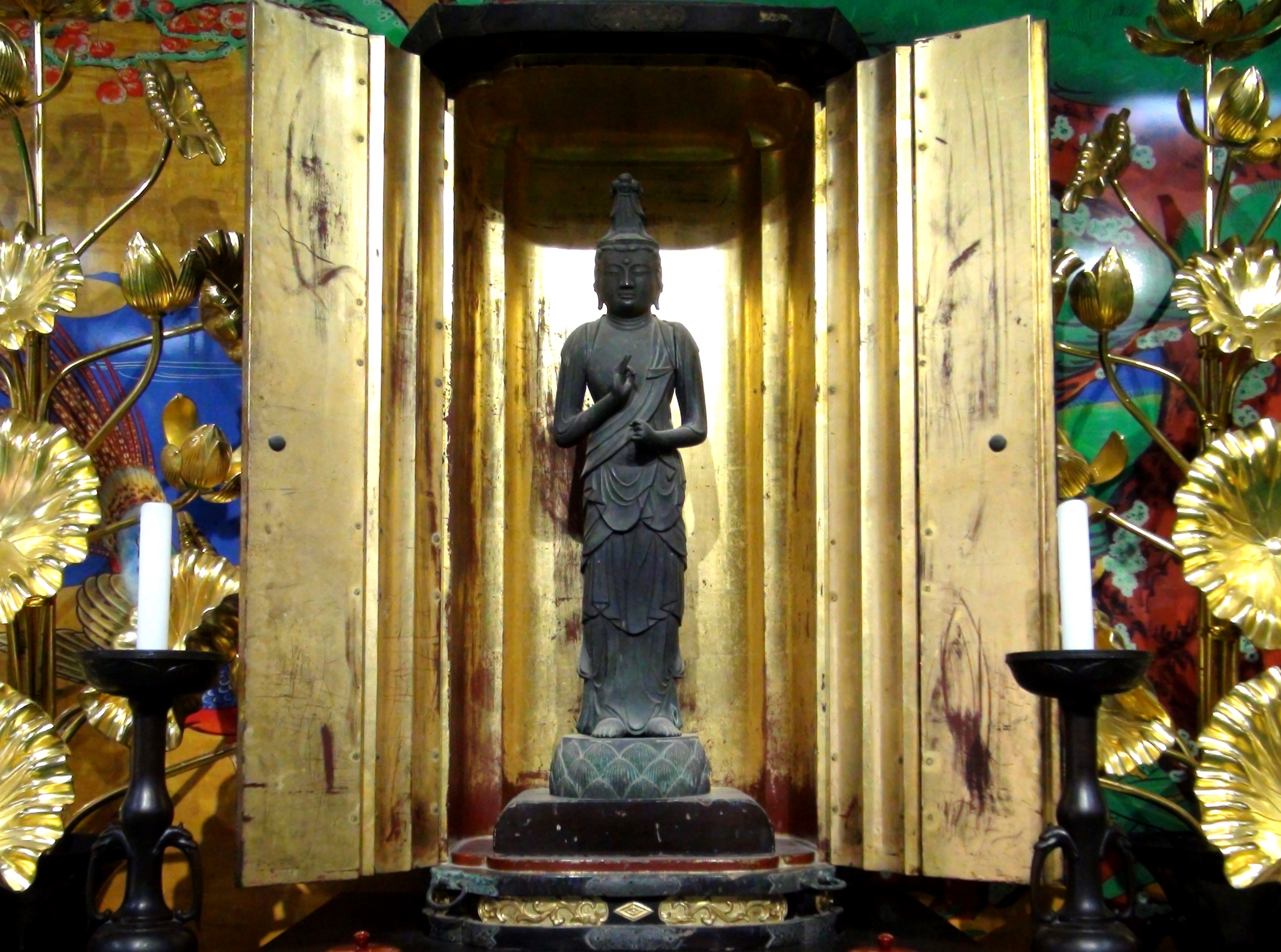
Honzon Shō-Kannon Bosatsu

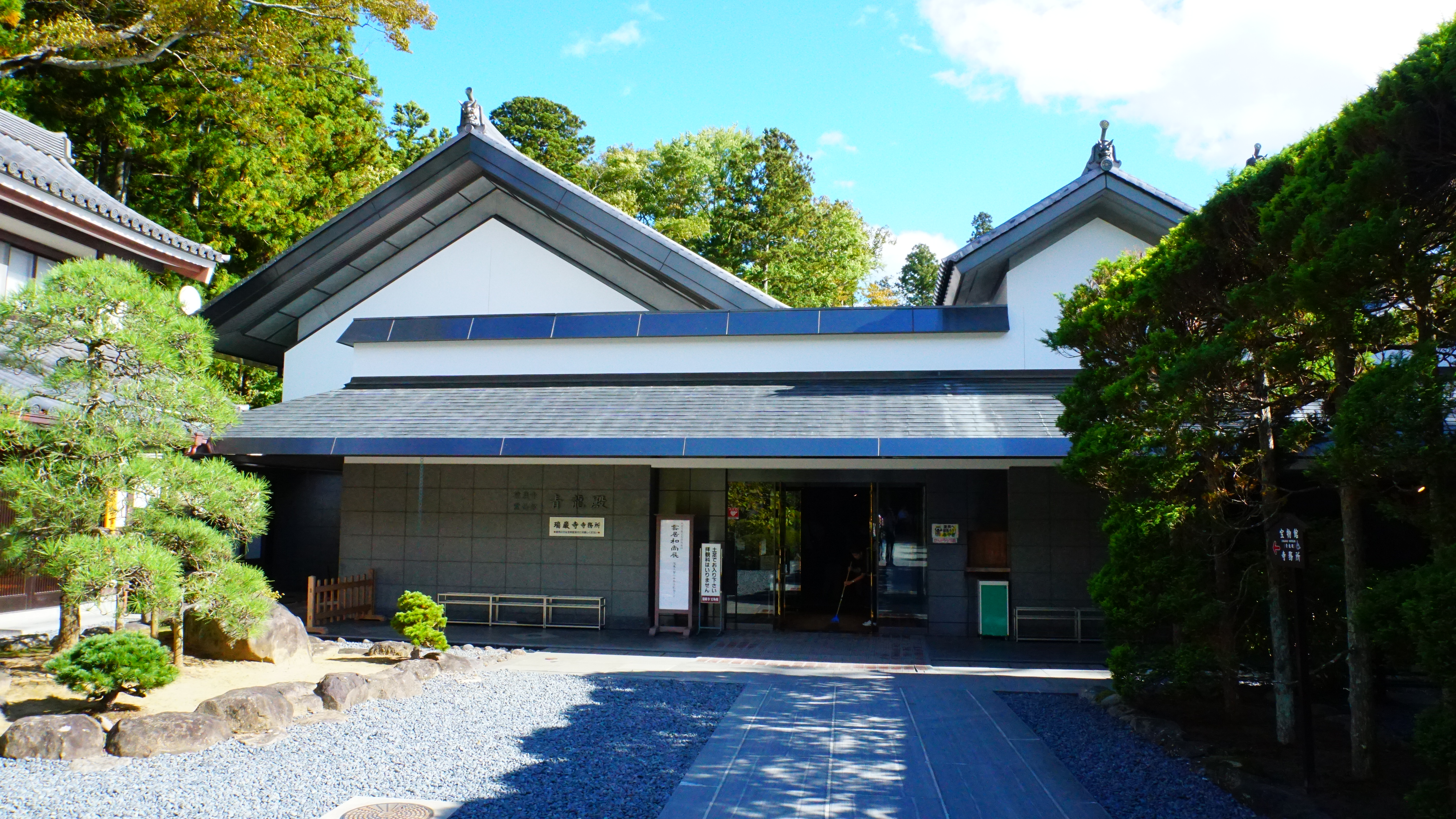
Seiryuden Museum

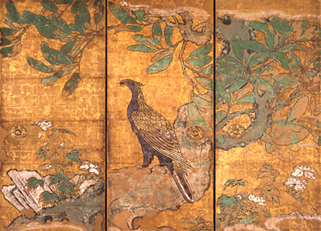
One of the fusuma paintings in the Hondo (ICP)

== Cultural properties ==
=== National Treasures ===
- Zuigan-ji Hondō (former Hōjō) (瑞巖寺本堂（元方丈)), Edo period (1609); This was the abbot's quarters when Date Masamune rebuilt the temple, and the roof was completed in March 1619.
- Zuigan-ji Kuri and ryōka (瑞巖寺庫裏及び廊下), Edo period (1609); This was the temple's kitchen and associated hallway connecting it to the Main Hall.

=== Important Cultural Properties ===
- Zuigan-ji Middle Gate (瑞巖寺中門), Edo period (1609); .
- Zuigan-ji Onarimon Gate (瑞巖寺御成門), Edo period (1609); .
- Godai-dō (with altar) (五大堂 附:厨子), Edo period (1604);
- Wooden statues of Five Wisdom Kings (木造五大明王像), Heian period; This are hibutsu hidden images opened to the public once every 33 years. The central statue, Fudō Myōō, is a seated statue resembling Kukai, wearing a lotus-headed head, eyes wide open, upper teeth exposed, and seven ties in his pigtail. The other statues, in terms of the number of arms and the appearance of their faces, are largely based on common iconography, including that of the statues in the Tō-ji Lecture Hall. All are carved from single blocks of keyaki wood.
- Painting: Hondo fusuma (本堂障壁画), Edo period; set of 161 paintings. Located in the temple's Main Hall, these sliding doors are painted on a gold background with rich colors. Many feature various raised motifs on golden clouds, further enhancing the luxurious atmosphere of the gold background.
- Unban gong (雲版), Kamakura period (1326);
- Ōshū Mishima Raiken monument (奥州御島頼賢碑), Kamakura period (1307); with inscription by Yishan Yining

=== Miyagi Prefecture Designated Tangible Cultural Property ===
- Sōmon gate (瑞巌寺総門), Edo period;

== See also ==
- Glossary of Japanese Buddhism
- List of National Treasures of Japan (temples)

== Sources ==
- Sōshun, Horino; Ono, Miki; Higuchi, Tooru (October 31, 1995), Zuigan-ji Museum (2nd ed.), Matsushima-chō, Miyagi Prefecture: Hirano Sōjō – Kōsoku Bijutsu Printing Co.
