= Entsū-in (Matsushima) =

Buddhist temple in Matsushima, Miyagi, Japan

- 円通院
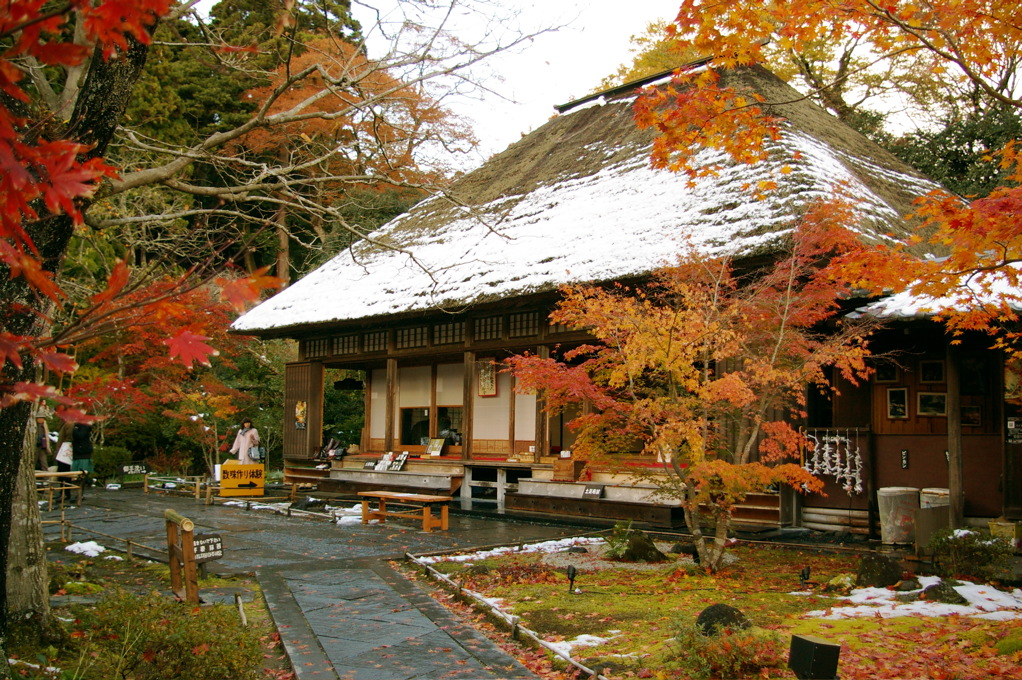
- Entsū-in

- Location within Miyagi Prefecture Location within Japan

Religion
- Affiliation: Buddhist
- Deity: Shō Kannon Bosatsu
- Rite: Rinzai Zen, Myōshin-ji school)
- Status: active

Location
- Location: 67 Matsushima Chōnai, Matsushima-chō, Miyagi-gun, Miyagi-ken
- Country: Japan
- Coordinates: 38°22′16″N 141°03′35″E

Architecture
- Founder: Date Tadamune
- Completed: 1647

Website
- Official website (in Japanese)

Entsū-in (円通院) is a Buddhist temple located in the town of Matsushima, Miyagi Prefecture, Japan. Belonging to the Myōshin-ji-branch of Rinzai Zen, it was founded in 1647 next to Zuigan-ji as the memorial temple for Date Mitsumune, the grandson of Date Masamune. The temple is noted for its rose gardens. The mausoleum of Date Mitsumune is decorated with Namban art motifs inspired by late Sengoku period contact with the West, and has been designated an Important Cultural Property. The temple also has a Japanese garden attributed to Kobori Enshū.

== Main hall ==
The Main Hall has a thatched hip roof and is named the Daihitei (大悲亭, lit. Great Sadness Cottage). It was dismantled and moved from Edo. Inside is enshrined a Muromachi period statue of Kannon seated on a lotus throne. Made of Japanese cypress using the yoseki-zukuri technique, it is gilded over lacquer.

== Mausoleum ==
The three-bay Tamaya (霊屋) or mausoleum of Date Mitsumune, grandson of Date Masamune, was built in 1647 and is an Important Cultural Property. Inside, the shrine of Date Mitsumune is decorated with motifs including spades, hearts, diamonds, clubs, roses and other western flowers. The Tamaya was damaged by the 2011 Tōhoku earthquake and tsunami.

== Gardens ==
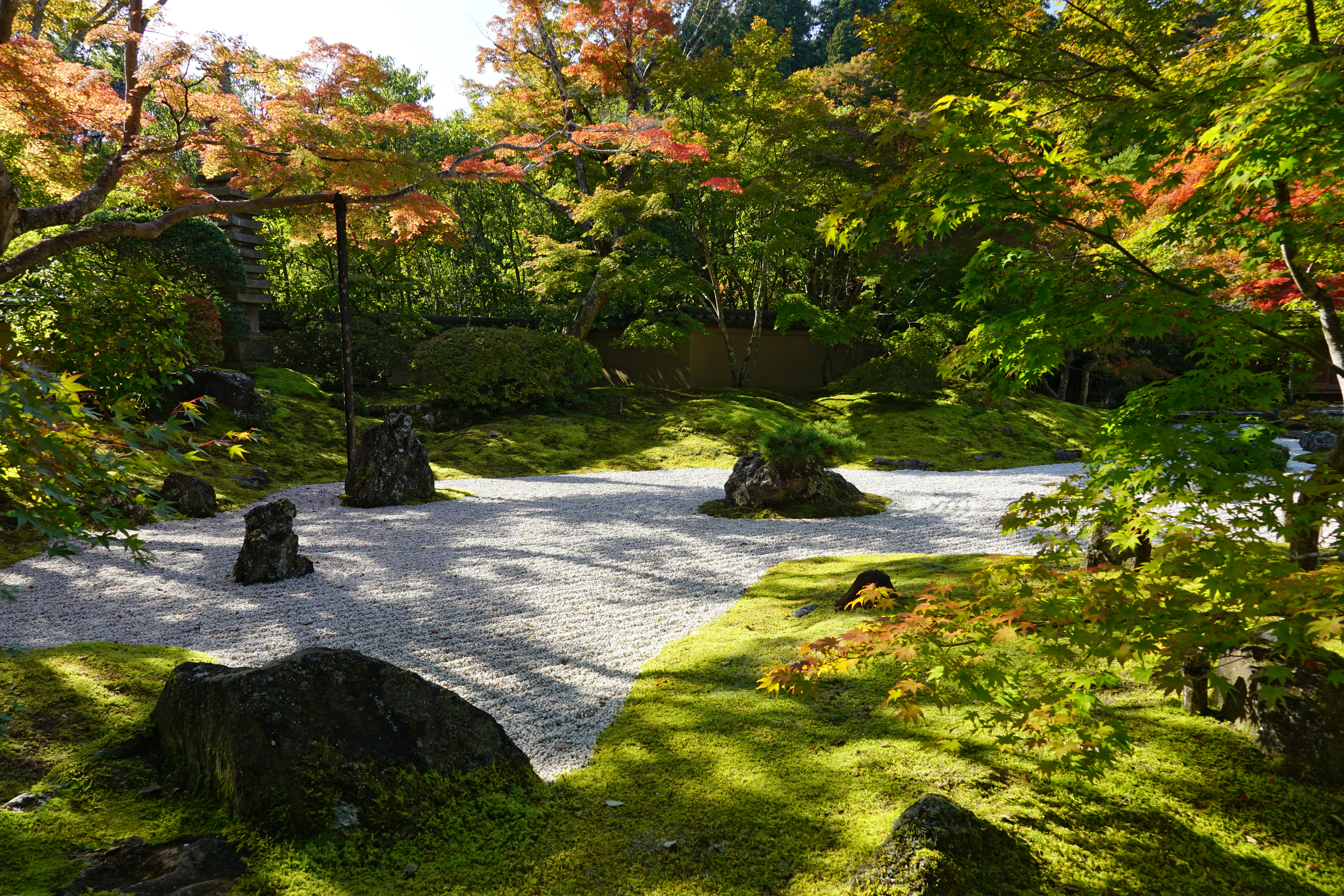
Karesansui garden of Entsū-in

The gardens of Entsū-in are divided into four areas: a karesansui garden; a moss garden around a pond shaped like the character for heart (心), attributed to Kobori Enshū; a rose garden inspired by the Date encounter with the Christian west; and a natural stand of cryptomeria. In autumn the temple is celebrated for its momiji.

== Pilgrimage ==
Entsū-in is Temple No.1 on the Sanriku 33 Kannon pilgrimage route.

== See also ==
- Zuigan-ji
- Date clan
- Zuihōden
- Namban art
