= Atago Station (Miyagi) =

Railway station in Matsushima, Miyagi Prefecture, Japan

Atago Station 愛宕駅
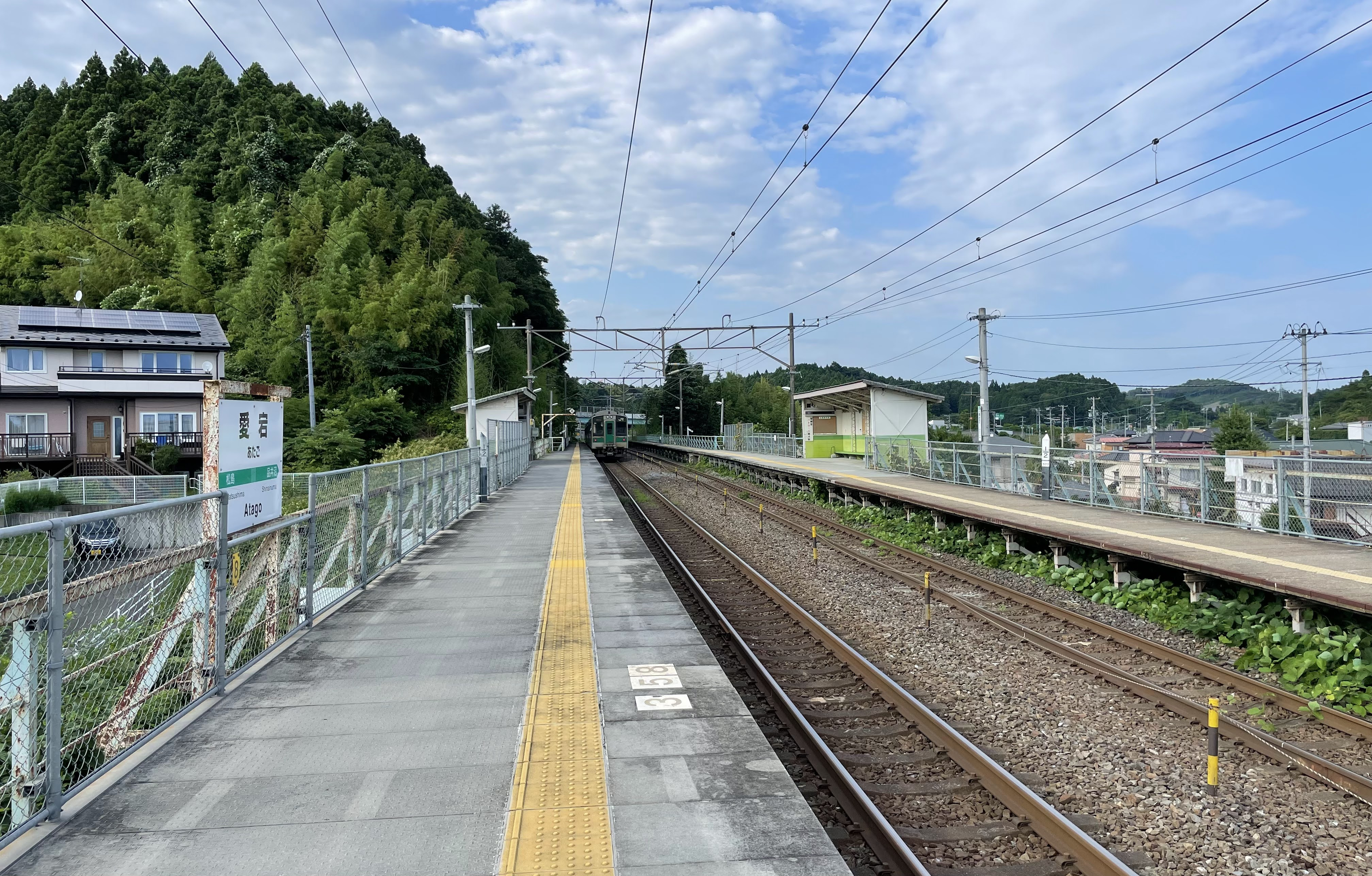
- Atago Station platforms in July. 2022

General information
- Location: Takagi, Matsushima-cho, Miyagi-gun, Miyagi-ken 981-0215; Japan
- Coordinates: 38.3974°N 141.065°E
- Operator: JR East
- Line: ■ Tōhoku Main Line
- Distance: 377.2 km from Tokyo
- Platforms: 2 side platforms
- Tracks: 2

Construction
- Structure type: At grade

Other information
- Status: Unstaffed
- Website: Official website

History
- Opened: July 1, 1962

Services
Preceding station	JR East	Following station
Matsushima towards Kuroiso	Tōhoku Main Line Local	Shinainuma towards Morioka
Location
- Location within Miyagi Prefecture Location within Japan

Atago Station (愛宕駅, Atago-eki) is a railway station in the town of Matsushima, Miyagi Prefecture, Japan, operated by East Japan Railway Company (JR East).

== Lines ==
Atago Station is served by the Tōhoku Main Line, and is located 377.2 rail kilometers from the official starting point of the line at Tokyo Station.

== Station layout ==
The station has two unnumbered opposed side platforms. There is no station building and the station is unattended.

=== Platforms ===
east side	■ Tōhoku Main Line	for Matsushima and Sendai
west side	■ Tōhoku Main Line	for Kogota and Ichinoseki

== History ==
Atago Station opened on July 1, 1962. The station was absorbed into the JR East network upon the privatization of the Japanese National Railways (JNR) on April 1, 1987.

== Surrounding area ==
- National Route 45
- National Route 346

== See also ==
- List of railway stations in Japan
