= Kanrantei =

Coordinates: 38.369487°N 141.061341°E

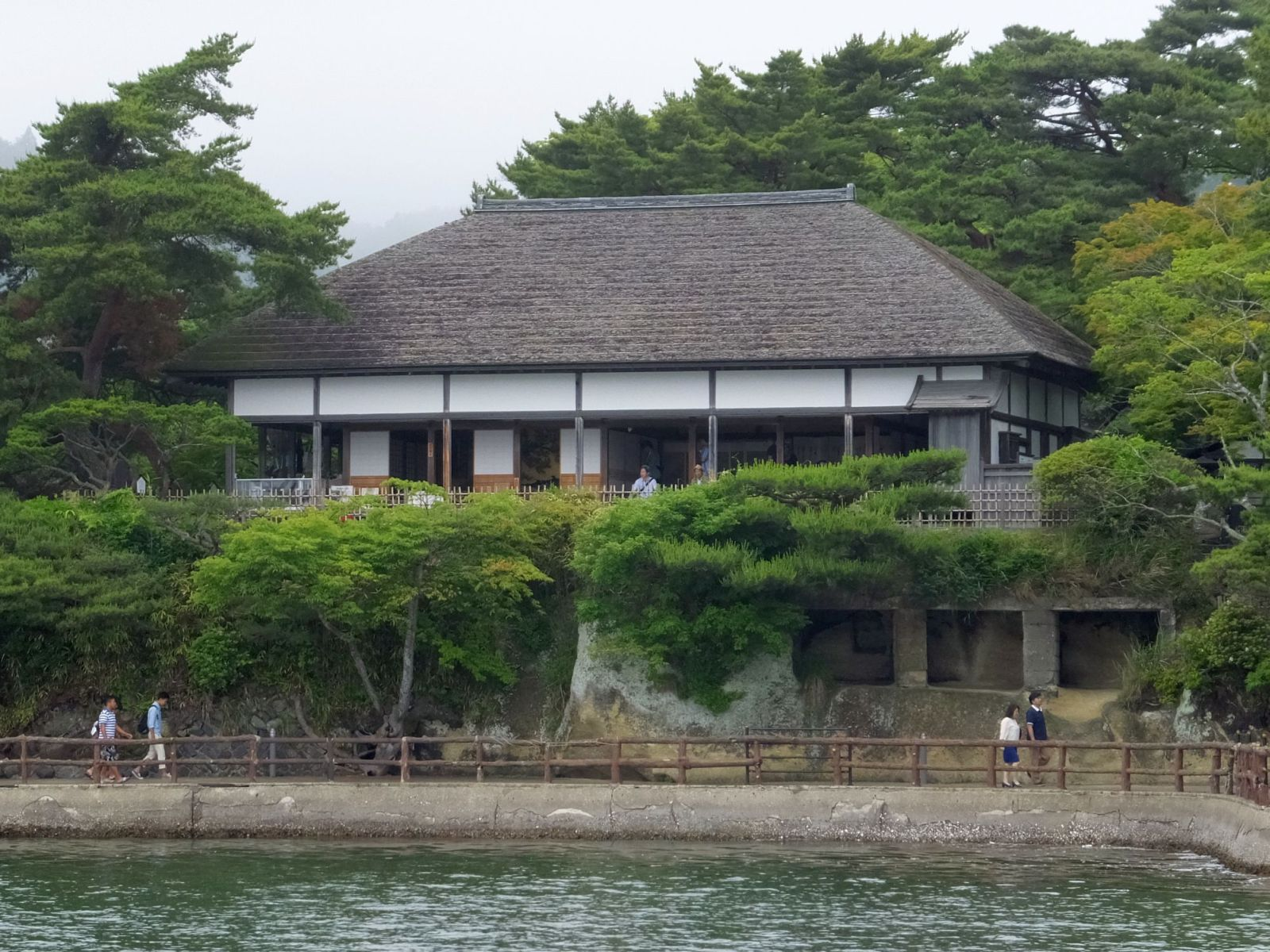

Kanrantei (観瀾亭) is the only building to survive from a mansion complex of the Date clan in Matsushima, Miyagi Prefecture, Japan. It is said to have originated as a teahouse in Toyotomi Hideyoshi's Fushimi Castle, to have been moved to Edo by Date Masamune, and finally to have been brought to Matsushima by his son Date Tadamune.

It has been designated a Prefectural Cultural Property. Inside, 21 painted fusuma panels of the Edo period have been designated an Important Cultural Property.

== See also ==
- Fushimi Castle
- Japanese painting
