= Matsushima Station =

Railway station in Miyagi Prefecture, Japan

Matsushima Station 松島駅
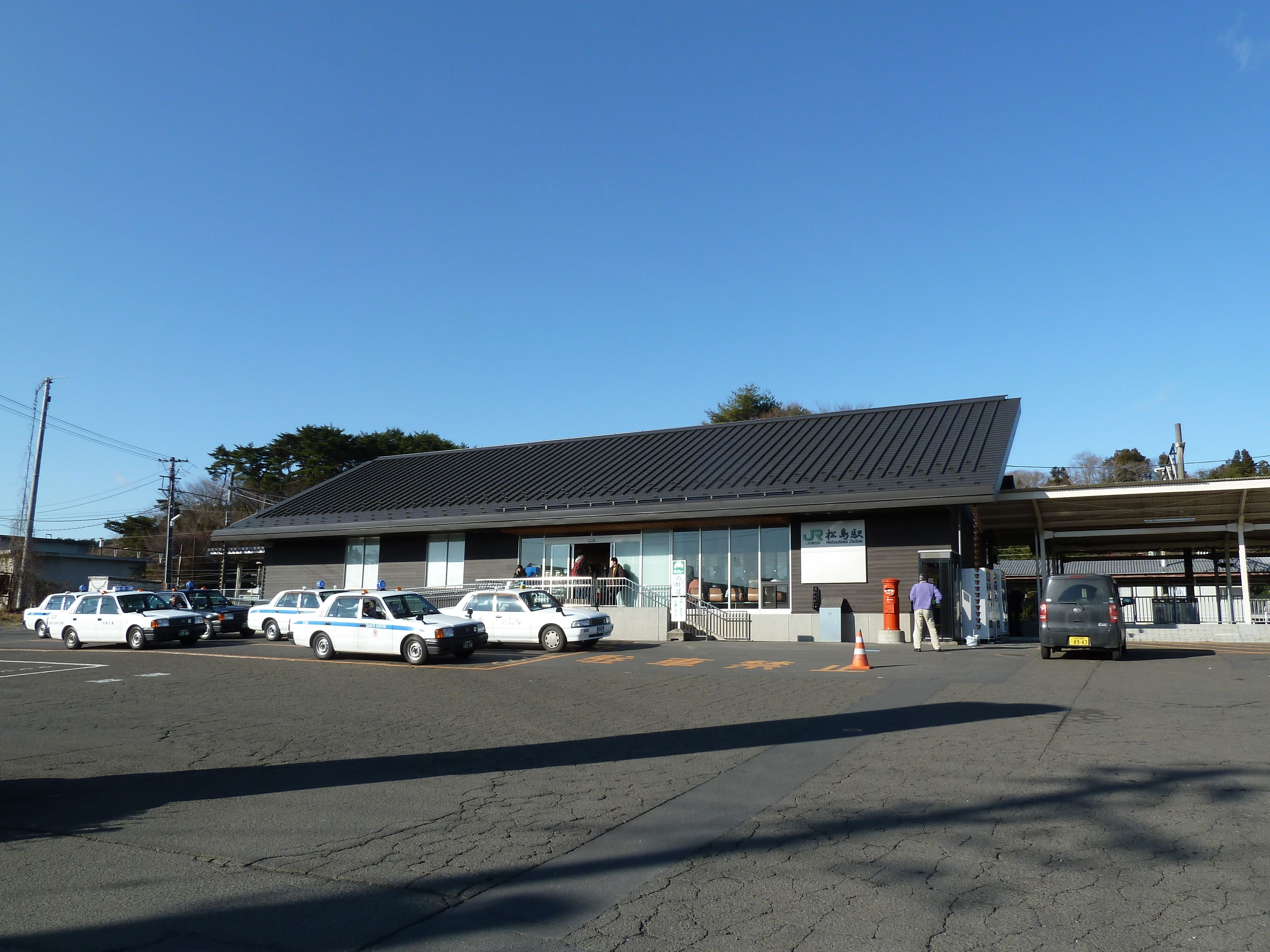
- Matsushima Station, December 2011

General information
- Location: 7-4 Matsushima-Konashiya, Matsushima-cho, Miyagi-gun, Miyagi-ken 981-0213; Japan
- Coordinates: 38.3807°N 141.0665°E
- Operator: JR East
- Line: ■ Tōhoku Main Line
- Distance: 375.2 km from Tokyo
- Platforms: 1 side + 1 island platform
- Tracks: 3

Construction
- Structure type: At grade

Other information
- Status: Staffed ("Midori no Madoguchi")
- Website: Official website

History
- Opened: July 9, 1956
- Former names: Shin-Matsushima (until 1962)

Passengers
- FY2018: 829 daily

Services
Preceding station	JR East	Following station
Shiogama towards Kuroiso	Tōhoku Main Line Local	Atago towards Morioka
Location
- Location within Miyagi Prefecture Location within Japan

Matsushima Station (松島駅, Matsushima-eki) is a railway station in the town of Matsushima, Miyagi, Japan, operated by East Japan Railway Company (JR East). This station is about 1 km from Takagimachi Station and about 2 km away from Matsushima-Kaigan Station on the Senseki Line. Of the three, Matsushima-Kaigan is the station closest to most tourist destinations.

== Lines ==
Matsushima Station is served by the Tōhoku Main Line, and is located 375.2 rail kilometers from the official starting point of the line at Tokyo Station.

== Station layout ==
The station has one side platform and one island platform connected by a footbridge. The station has a "Midori no Madoguchi" staffed ticket office.

=== Platforms ===
1	■ Tōhoku Main Line	for Shiogama, Sendai, Shiroishi, and Fukushima
2	■ Tōhoku Main Line	for starting trains in both directions
3	■ Tōhoku Main Line	for Kogota and Ichinoseki

== History ==
Matsushima Station opened on July 9, 1956 as Shin-Matsushima Station (新松島駅, Shin-Matsushima-eki), having been elevated from a signal stop established on November 15, 1944, when the routing of the Tohoku Main Line was moved away from the coastline due to security concerns in World War II (the original Matsushima Station, established on April 16, 1944 was renamed "former Matsushima Station" and was closed in 1962). The station was renamed to its present name on July 1, 1962. The station was absorbed into the JR East network upon the privatization of the Japanese National Railways (JNR) on April 1, 1987. A new station building was completed in March 2010.

== Passenger statistics ==
In fiscal 2018, the station was used by an average of 829 passengers daily (boarding passengers only).

== Surrounding area ==
- Matsushima Town Hall
- Matsushima Post Office
- National Route 45

== See also ==
- List of railway stations in Japan
