= Miyagino-ku =

Miyagino 宮城野区
- Ward
- Miyagino Ward
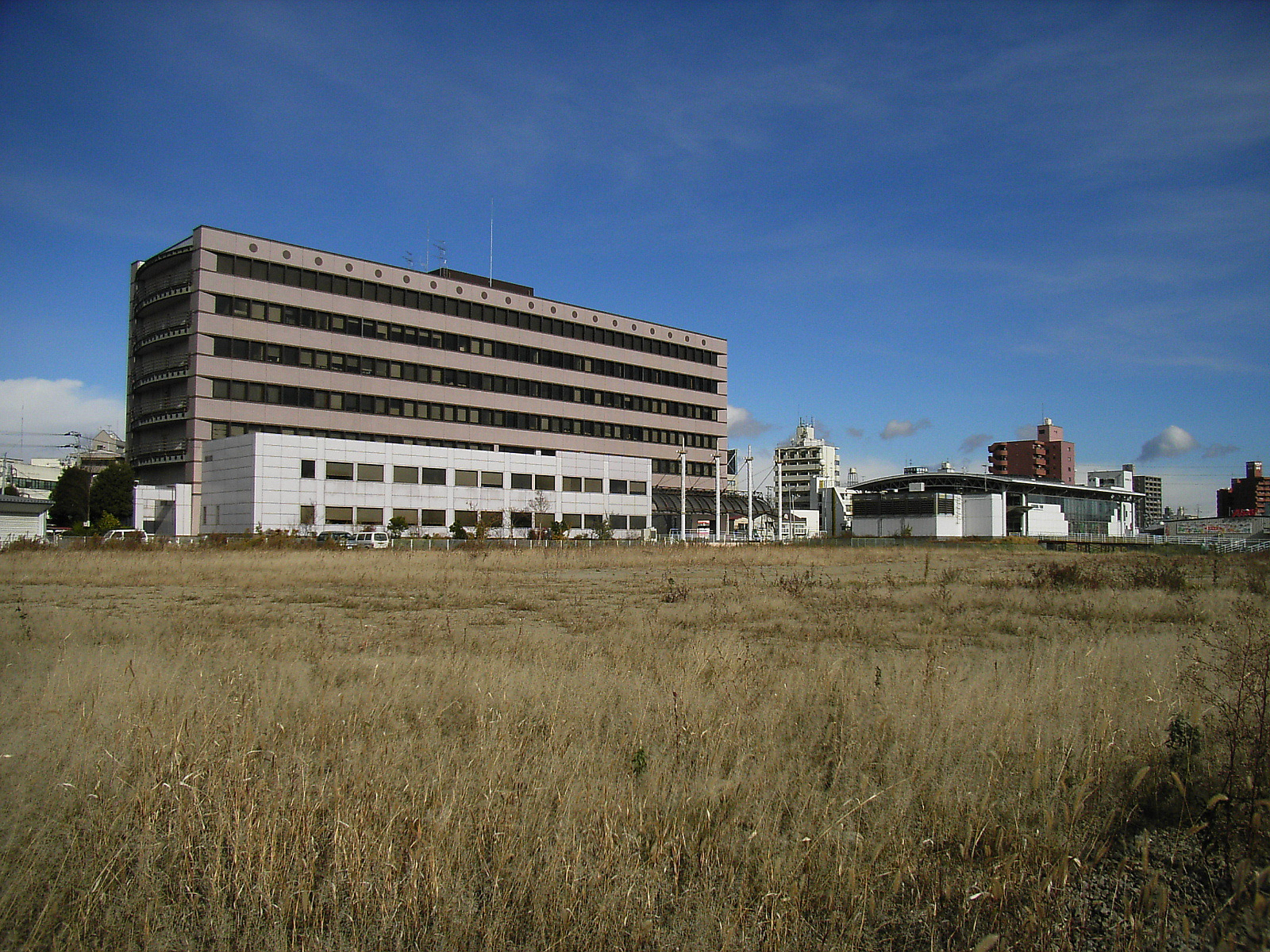
- Miyagino Ward Office

- Flag

- Location of Miyagino-ku in Sendai

- Coordinates: 38°15′59″N 140°54′37″E
- Country: Japan
- Region: Tōhoku
- Prefecture: Miyagi
- City: Sendai

Area
  - Total: 5,819 km^{2} (2,247 sq mi)

Population (August 1, 2017)
  - Total: 196,086
  - Density: 3,370/km^{2} (8,700/sq mi)
- Time zone: UTC+9 (Japan Standard Time)
- Symbols
- Phone number: 022-291-2111
- Address: 2-12-35 Gorin, Miyagino-ku, Sendai-shi, Miyagi-ken 981-3189
- Website: Official website (in Japanese)

Miyagino-ku (宮城野区) is the northeastern ward of the city Sendai, in Miyagi Prefecture, Japan. As of 1 July 2017, the ward had a population of 196,086 and a population density of 3370 persons per km^{2} in 91322 households. The total area of the ward was 58.19 square kilometres (22.47 sq mi).

== Geography ==
Miyagino-ku is located on the coast, bordered by Sendai Bay on the Pacific Ocean to the east, and by the city of Tagajō to the north.

=== Neighboring municipalities ===
- Miyagi Prefecture
  - Aoba-ku, Sendai
  - Wakabayashi-ku, Sendai
  - Izumi-ku, Sendai
  - Tomiya
  - Tagajō
  - Rifu
  - Shichigahama

== History ==
The area of present-day Miyagino-ku was part of ancient Mutsu Province, and has been settled since at least the Japanese Paleolithic period. The area was inhabited by the Emishi people, and came under the control of the imperial dynasty during the late Nara period from their base at Tagajō. During the Heian period, the provincial capital of Mutsu Province was located near the vicinity of Iwakiri Station. The area was later controlled by the Northern Fujiwara clan of Hiraizumi. During the Sengoku period, the area was dominated by various samurai clans before coming under the control of the Date clan during the Edo period, who ruled Sendai Domain under the Tokugawa shogunate. With the April 1, 1889 establishment of the post-Meiji restoration municipalities system, the area became part of Miyagi District of Miyagi Prefecture. The area was annexed by the city of Sendai on 1 November 1987.

== Education ==
Miyagino-ku has 20 public elementary schools and 10 public junior high schools operated by the city government and one private combined middle/high school. The ward also has two public high schools operated by the Miyagi Prefectural Board of Education. The city also operates one special education school.

== Transportation ==
=== Railway ===
- JR East - Tōhoku Main Line
  - Higashi-Sendai - Iwakiri
- JR East - Senseki Line
  - Tsutsujigaoka - Miyaginohara - Rikuzen-Haranomachi - Nigatake - Kozurushinden - Fukudamachi - Rikuzen-Takasago - Nakanosakae
- Sendai Subway - Namboku Line
  - Miyagino-dori

=== Highway ===
- Sanriku Expressway
- Sendai-Tōbu Road
- National Route 4
- National Route 45

== Notable buildings ==
- Sendai Sun Plaza
- Rakuten Kobo Stadium Miyagi
