= Higashi-Sendai Station =

Railway station in Sendai, Japan

Higashi-Sendai Station 東仙台駅
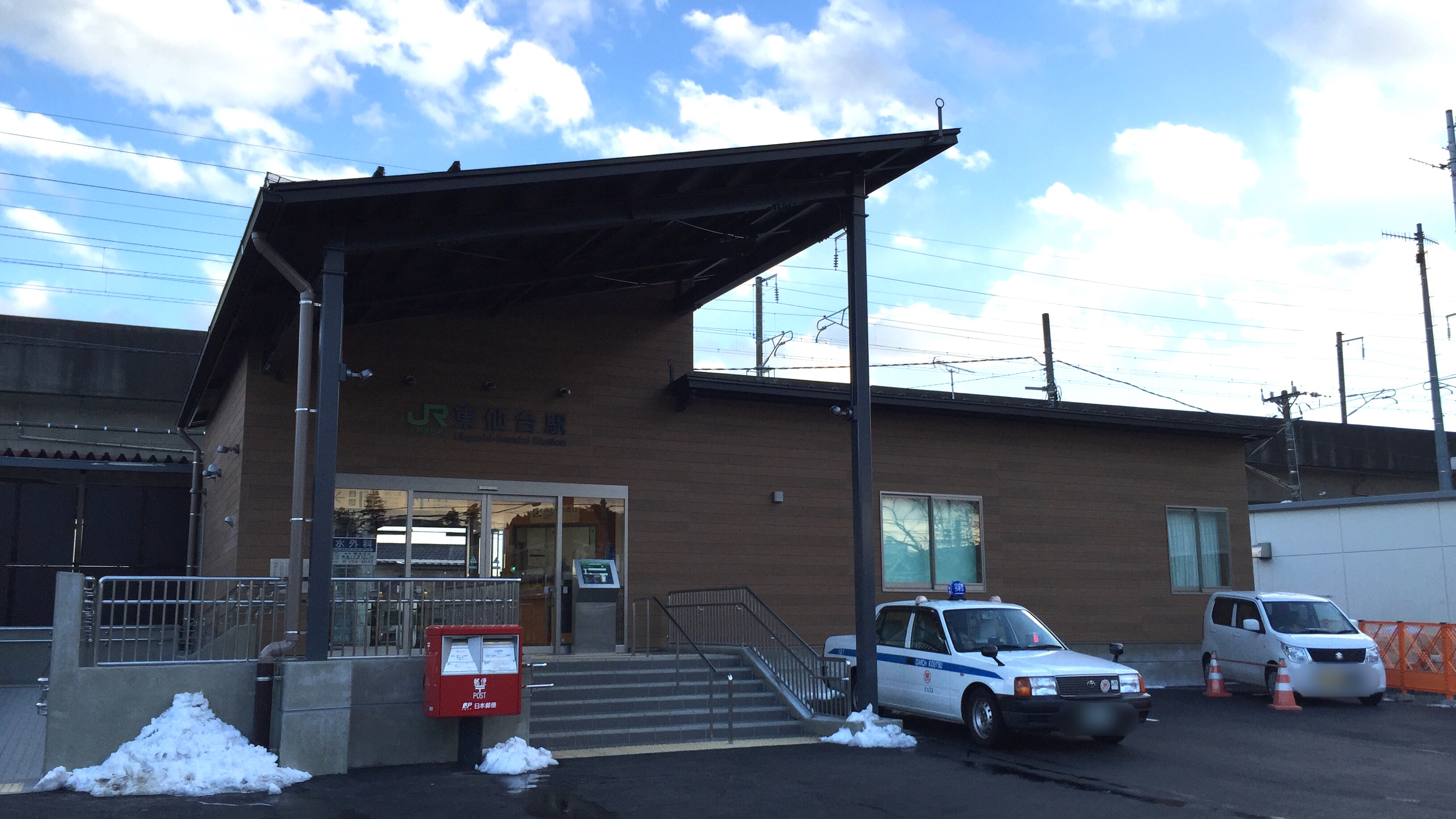
- Higashi-Sendai Station in March 2016

General information
- Location: 1-7-8 Higashi-Sendai, Miyagino-ku, Sendai-shi, Miyagi-ken 983-0038; Japan
- Coordinates: 38.2763°N 140.9202°E
- Operator: JR East
- Line: ■ Tōhoku Main Line
- Distance: 355.8 km from Tokyo
- Platforms: 1 side + 1 island platform
- Tracks: 3

Other information
- Status: Staffed (Midori no Madoguchi)
- Website: Official website

History
- Opened: July 25, 1932

Passengers
- FY2018: 3,628 daily

Services
Preceding station	JR East	Following station
Sendai towards Kuroiso	Tōhoku Main Line Local	Iwakiri towards Morioka
Sendai Terminus	Senseki-Tōhoku Line Rapid	Iwakiri towards Ishinomaki
Location
- Location within Miyagi Prefecture Location within Japan

Higashi-Sendai Station (東仙台駅, Higashi-Sendai-eki) is a railway station in Miyagino-ku, Sendai, Miyagi Prefecture, Japan, operated by East Japan Railway Company (JR East).

== Lines ==
Higashi-Sendai Station is served by the Tōhoku Main Line, and is located 355.8 kilometers from the official starting point of the line at Tokyo Station.

== Station layout ==
The station has one side platform and one island platform connected to the station building by a footbridge. The station has a Midori no Madoguchi staffed ticket office.

=== Platforms ===
1	■ Tohoku Main Line	for Rifu, Shiogama, Matsushima, and Kogota
2	■ Tohoku Main Line	for Sendai, Shiroishi, and Fukushima
3	■ Tohoku Main Line	(not used)

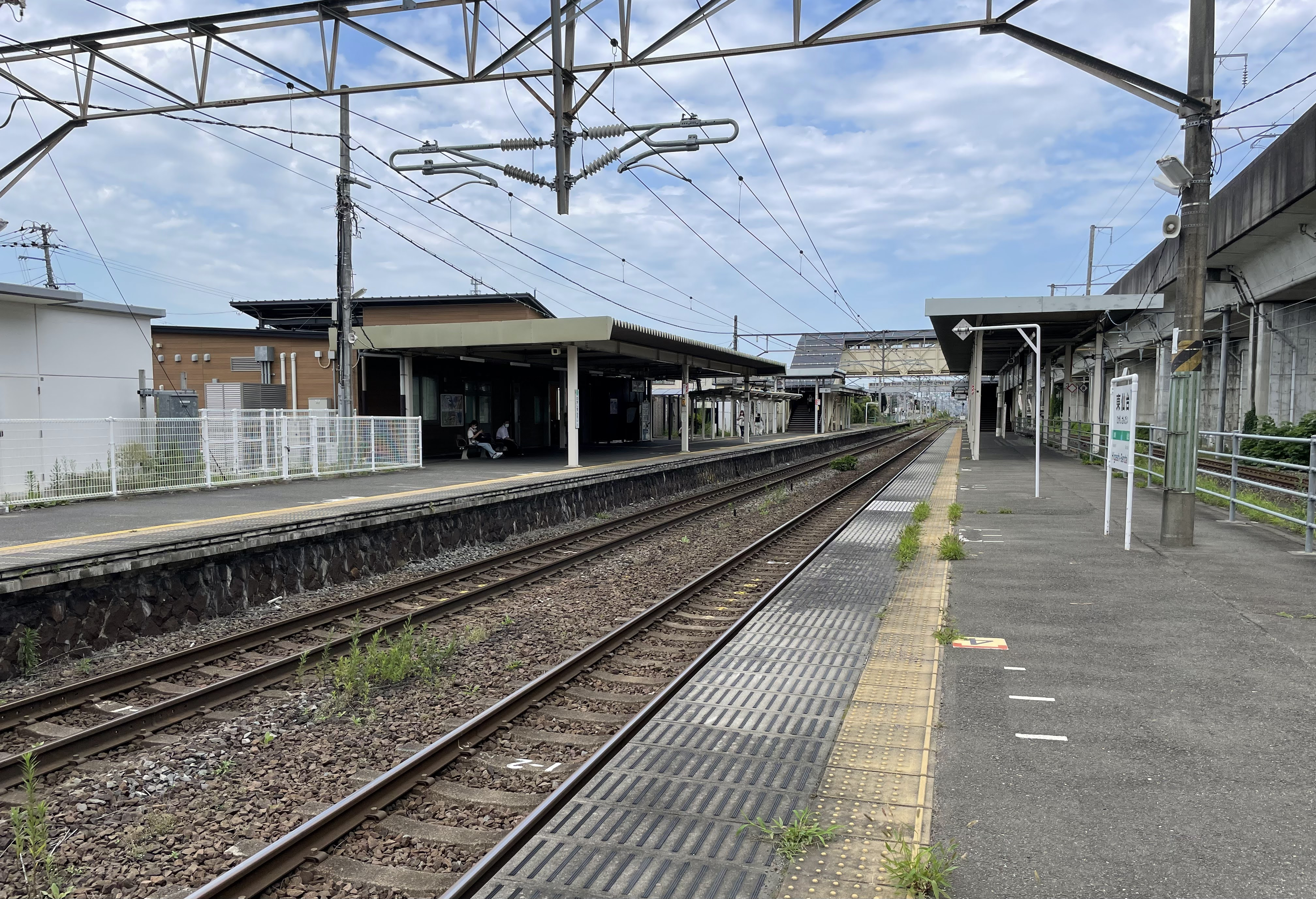
Platform in July, 2022

== History ==
Higashi-Sendai Station opened on July 25, 1932. The station was absorbed into the JR East network upon the privatization of the Japanese National Railways (JNR) on April 1, 1987.

== Passenger statistics ==
In fiscal 2018, the station was used by an average of 3,628 passengers daily (boarding passengers only).

== Surrounding area ==
- Nigatake Station on the Senseki Line
- Sendai-Higashi Post Office
- Sendai-Nitta Post Office

== See also ==
- List of railway stations in Japan
