= Rikuzen-Sannō Station =

Railway station in Tagajō, Miyagi Prefecture, Japan

Rikuzen-Sannō Station 陸前山王駅
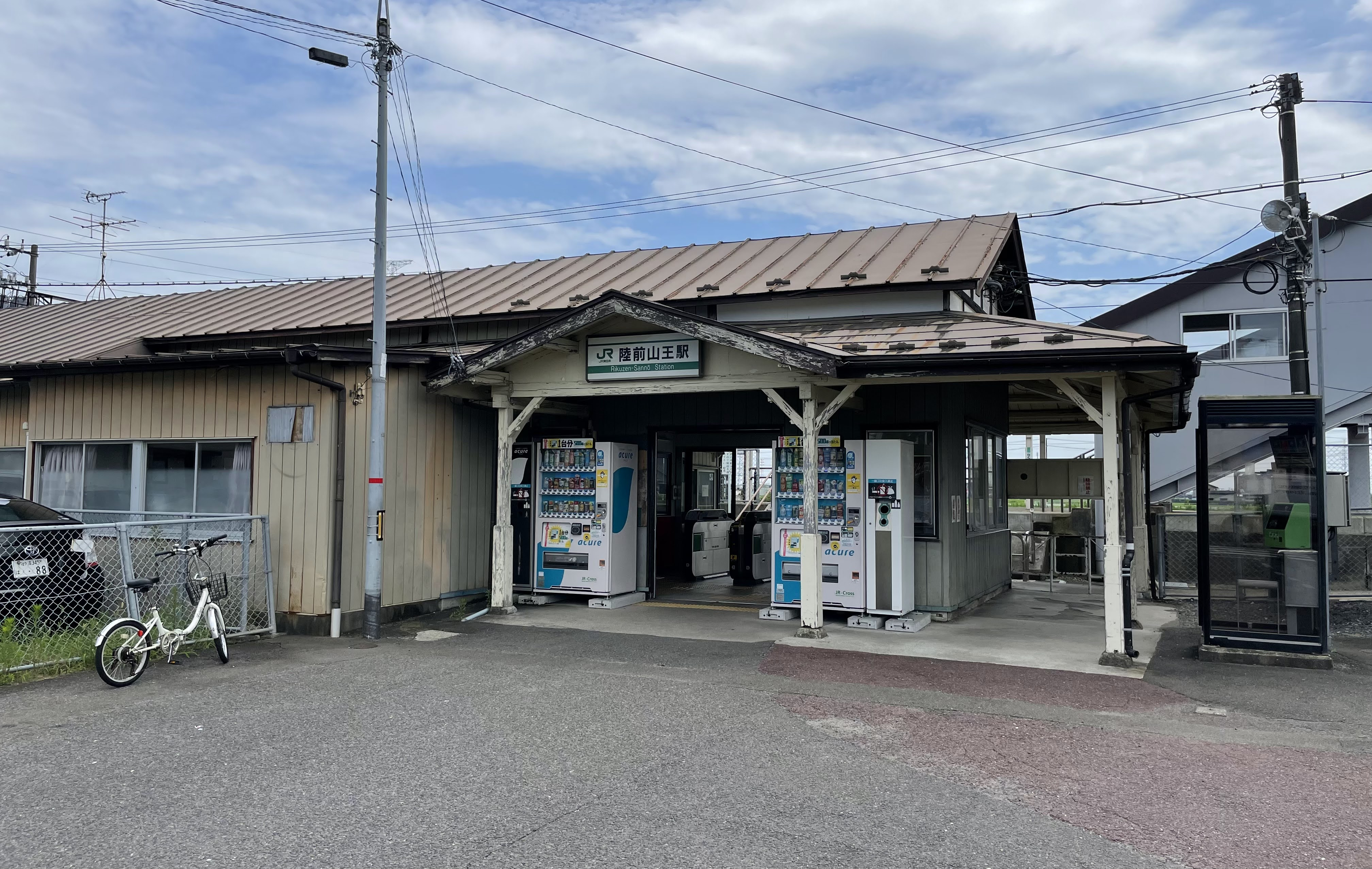
- Rikuzen-Sannō Station entrance in July, 2022

General information
- Location: Sannō, Tagajō-shi, Miyagi-ken; Japan
- Coordinates: 38.2996°N 140.9793°E
- Operator: JR East
- Line: ■ Tōhoku Main Line
- Distance: 362.2 km from Tokyo
- Platforms: 1 side + 1 island platform
- Tracks: 3

Other information
- Status: Unstaffed

History
- Opened: 15 August 1933
- Former names: Tagajō-mae (until 1944)

Passengers
- FY2013: 441 daily

Services
Preceding station	JR East	Following station
Iwakiri towards Kuroiso	Tōhoku Main Line Local	Kokufu-Tagajō towards Morioka
Iwakiri towards Sendai	Senseki-Tōhoku Line Rapid	Kokufu-Tagajō towards Ishinomaki
Location
- Location within Japan

Rikuzen-Sannō Station (陸前山王駅, Rikuzen-Sannō-eki) is a railway station in the city of Tagajō, Miyagi, Japan, operated by East Japan Railway Company (JR East).

== Lines ==
Rikuzen-Sannō Station is served by the Tōhoku Main Line, and is located 362.2 kilometers from the official starting point of the line at Tokyo Station. It is also a terminal for the freight-only Sendai Rinkai Railway. Trains of the Senseki-Tohoku Line also stop at the station.

== Station layout ==
The station has one side platform and one island platform connected to the station building by a footbridge. The station is unattended.

=== Platforms ===
1	■ Tōhoku Main Line	for Shiogama, Matsushima, and Kogota
2	■ Tōhoku Main Line	(not used)
3	■ Tōhoku Main Line	for Sendai, Shiroishi, and Fukushima

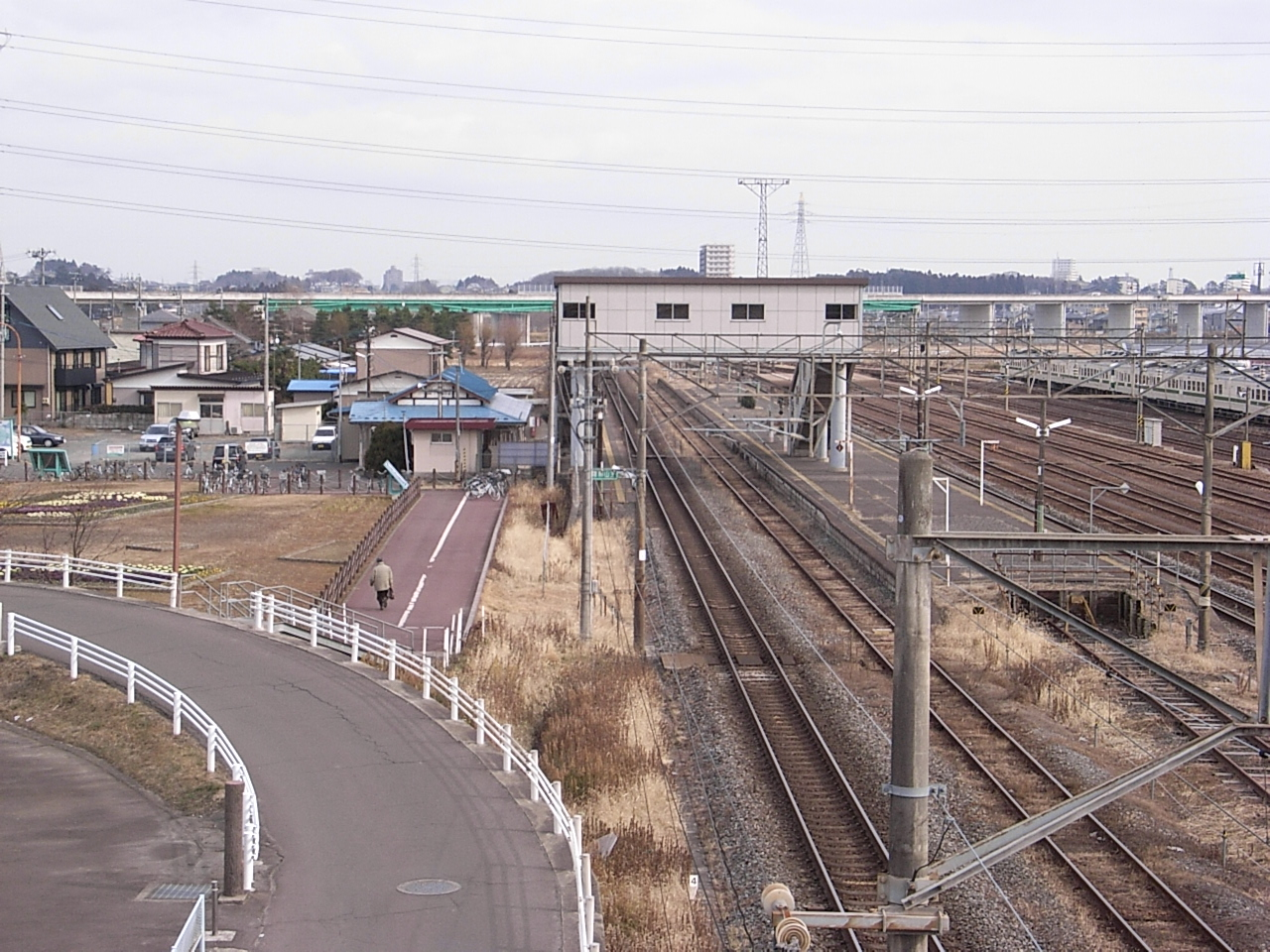
Rikuzen-Sannō Station with the freight yard on the right in January 2008

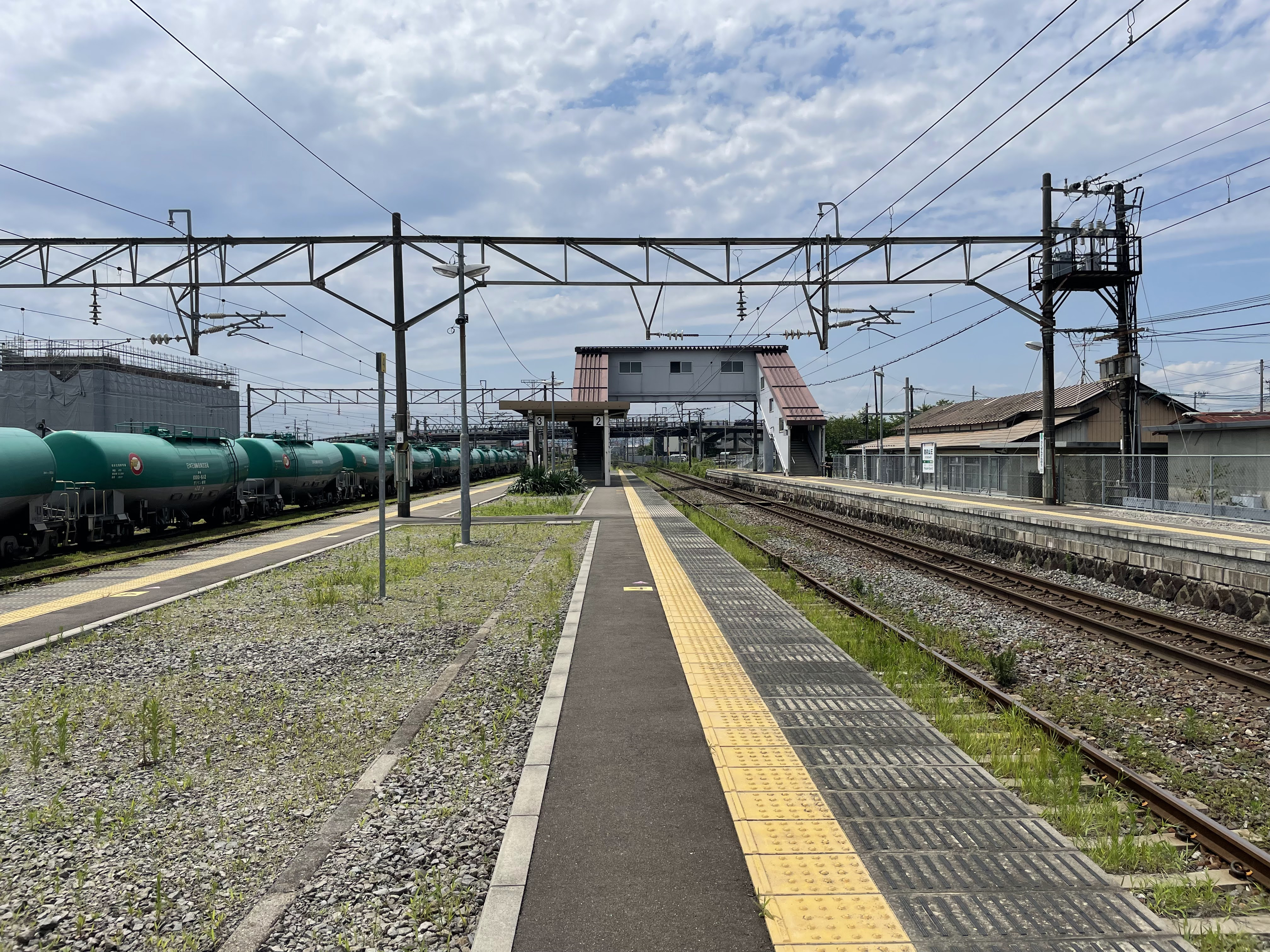
The platform (2,3) in July, 2022

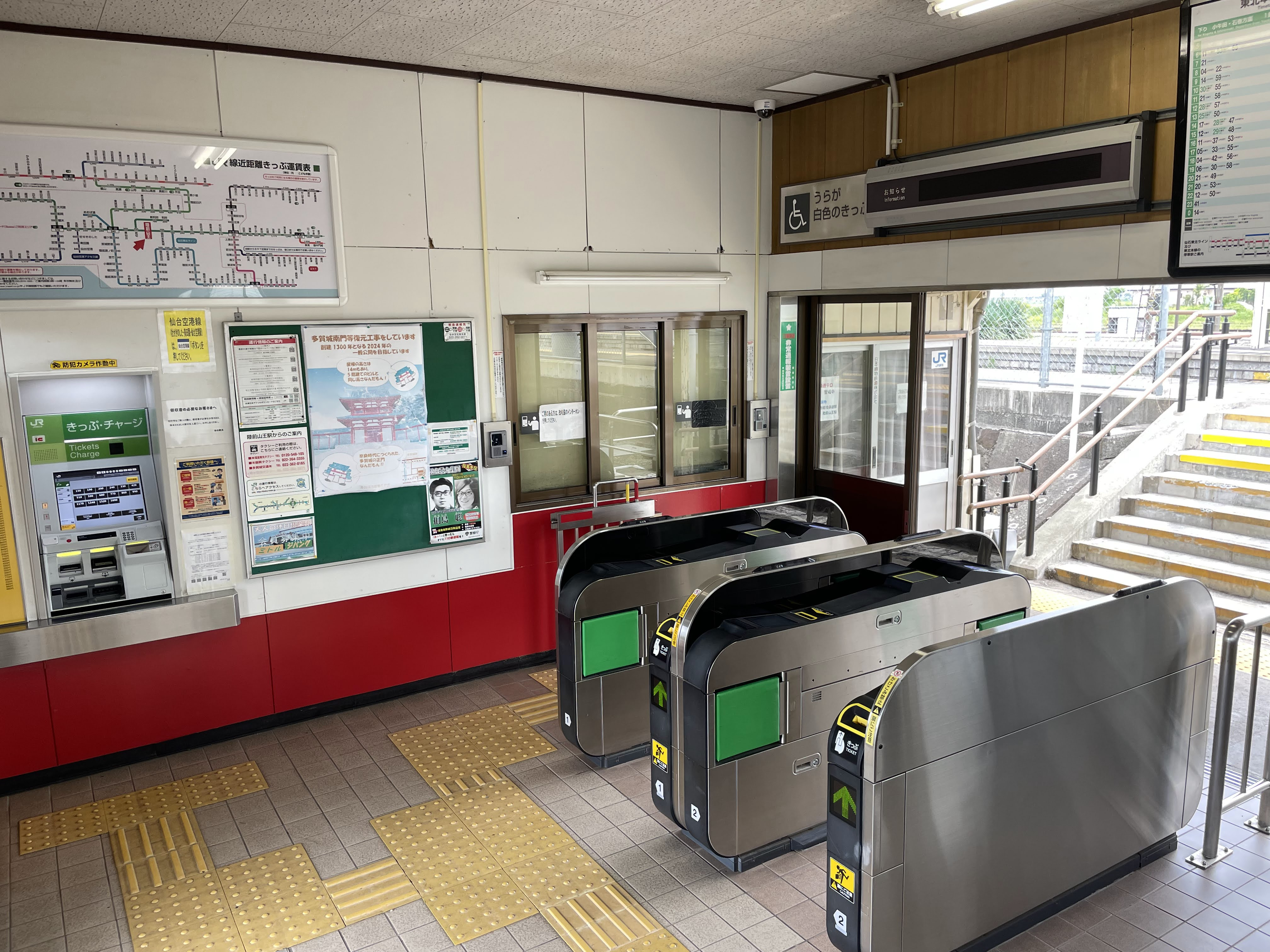
Ticket Gates in July, 2022

== History ==
The station opened on August 15, 1933, as Tagajō-mae Station (多賀城前駅). It was renamed Rikuzen-Sannō Station on May 1, 1944. The station was absorbed into the JR East network upon the privatization of the Japanese National Railways (JNR) on April 1, 1987.

== Surrounding area ==
- Tagajō City Library Sannō branch

== See also ==
- List of railway stations in Japan
