= Kokufu-Tagajō Station =

Railway station in Tagajō, Miyagi Prefecture, Japan

Kokufu-Tagajō Station 国府多賀城駅
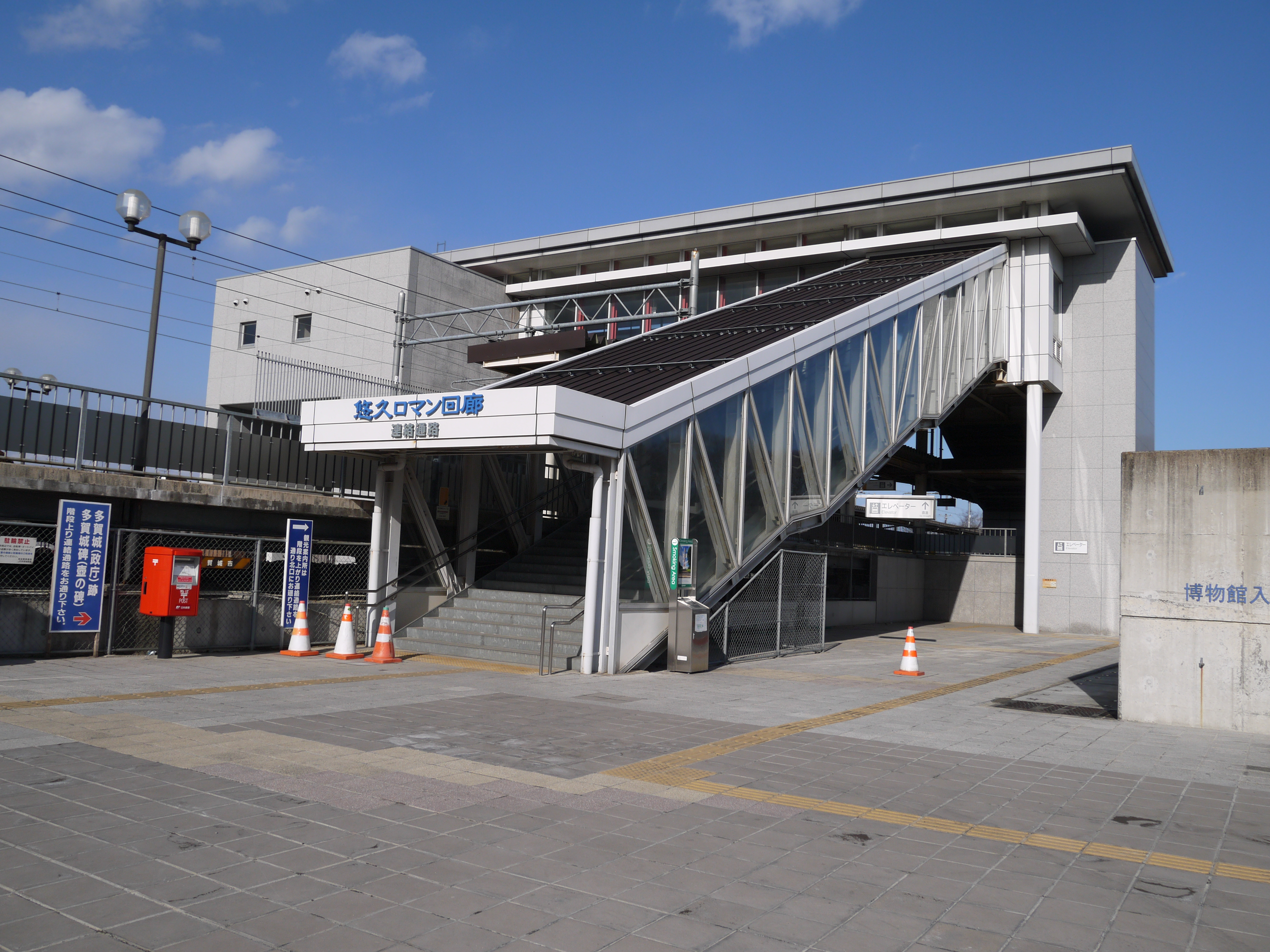
- Kokufu-Tagajō Station, north exit, August 2006

General information
- Location: Ukishima 1-9-22, Tagajō-shi, Miyagi-ken; Japan
- Coordinates: 38.3011°N 140.9942°E
- Operator: JR East
- Line: ■ Tōhoku Main Line
- Distance: 363.5 km from Tokyo
- Platforms: 2 side platforms
- Tracks: 1

Other information
- Status: Staffed (Midori no Madoguchi)
- Website: www.jreast.co.jp/estation/station/info.aspx?StationCd=1712

History
- Opened: September 29, 2001

Passengers
- FY2018: 1085

Services
Preceding station	JR East	Following station
Rikuzen-Sannō towards Kuroiso	Tōhoku Main Line Local	Shiogama towards Morioka
Rikuzen-Sannō towards Sendai	Senseki-Tōhoku Line Rapid	Shiogama towards Ishinomaki
Location
- Location within Miyagi Prefecture Location within Japan

Kokufu-Tagajō Station (国府多賀城駅, Kokufu-Tagajō-eki) is a railway station in the city of Tagajō, Miyagi Prefecture, Japan, operated by East Japan Railway Company (JR East).

== Lines ==
Kokufu-Tagajō Station is served by the Tōhoku Main Line, and is located 363.5 rail kilometers from the official starting point of the line at Tokyo Station. Trains of the Senseki-Tohoku Line also stop at the station.

== Station layout ==
The station has two side platforms with an elevated station building cantilevered over the tracks. The station has a Midori no Madoguchi staffed ticket office.

=== Platforms ===
1	■ Tōhoku Main Line	for Shiogama, Matsushima and Kogota
2	■ Tōhoku Main Line	for Sendai, Shiroishi and Fukushima

== History ==
Kokufu-Tagajō Station opened on September 29, 2001. The station was absorbed into the JR East network upon the privatization of the Japanese National Railways (JNR) on April 1, 1987.

== Passenger statistics ==
In fiscal 2018, the station was used by an average of 1,085 passengers daily (boarding passengers only).

== Surrounding area ==
- Taga Castle ruins
- Tōhoku History Museum
- Tohoku Gakuin University School of Engineering, Tagajō campus
