= Shiogama =

Shiogama 塩竈市
- City
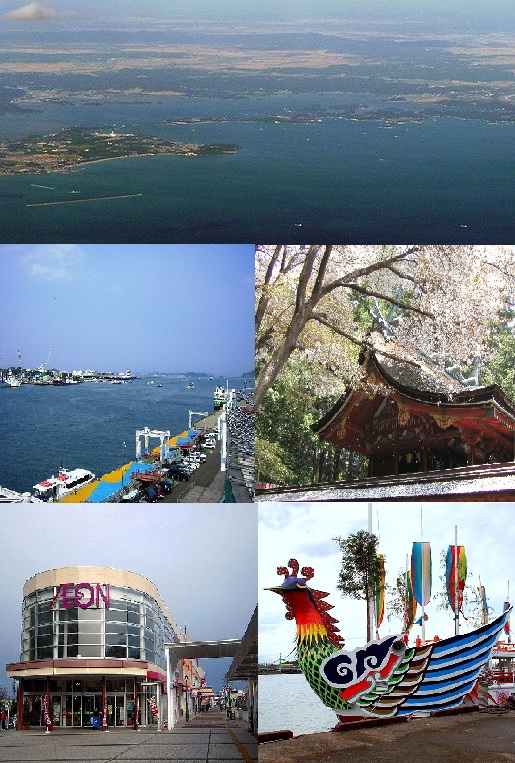
- Urato islands Shiogama Port, Shiogama Shrine; Aeon Town Shiogama, Shiogama Port Festival

- Flag Seal

- Location of Shiogama in Miyagi Prefecture

- Coordinates: 38°18′51.7″N 141°01′19.1″E
- Country: Japan
- Region: Tōhoku
- Prefecture: Miyagi
- City Settled: November 23, 1941

Government
  - Mayor: Kōki Satō (from September 2019)

Area
  - Total: 17.37 km^{2} (6.71 sq mi)

Population (June 1, 2019)
  - Total: 52,662
  - Density: 3,032/km^{2} (7,852/sq mi)
- Time zone: UTC+9 (Japan Standard Time)
- Phone number: 022-364-1111
- Address: 1-1 Asahimachi, Shiogama-shi, Miyagi-ken 985-8501
- Climate: Cfa
- Website: http://www.city.shiogama.miyagi.jp/
- Symbols
- Flower: White Chrysanthemum
- Tree: Shiogama Sakura

Shiogama (塩竈市 or 塩釜市, Shiogama-shi) is a city located in Miyagi Prefecture, Japan. As of 1 June 2019, the city had an estimated population of 52,662, and a population density of 3,032 persons per km² in 23,270 households. The total area of the city is 17.37 square kilometres (6.71 sq mi).

== Geography ==
Shiogama is in north-central Miyagi Prefecture, bordered by the Pacific Ocean to the east.

=== Neighboring municipalities ===
- Miyagi Prefecture
  - Rifu
  - Shichigahama
  - Tagajō

=== Climate ===
Shiogama has a humid subtropical climate (Köppen climate classification Cfa) characterized by mild summers and cold winters. The average annual temperature in Shiogama is 11.8 °C (53.2 °F). The average annual rainfall is 1,175.0 mm (46.26 in) with September as the wettest month. The temperatures are highest on average in August, at around 23.5 °C (74.3 °F), and lowest in January, at around 0.9 °C (33.6 °F).

Climate data for Shiogama (1991−2020 normals, extremes 1976−present)
Month	Jan	Feb	Mar	Apr	May	Jun	Jul	Aug	Sep	Oct	Nov	Dec	Year
Record high °C (°F)	14.4 (57.9)	20.7 (69.3)	21.3 (70.3)	30.0 (86.0)	30.9 (87.6)	34.2 (93.6)	35.5 (95.9)	35.8 (96.4)	35.7 (96.3)	30.0 (86.0)	23.5 (74.3)	20.7 (69.3)	35.8 (96.4)
Mean daily maximum °C (°F)	4.4 (39.9)	5.2 (41.4)	8.9 (48.0)	14.5 (58.1)	19.3 (66.7)	22.3 (72.1)	25.7 (78.3)	27.4 (81.3)	24.1 (75.4)	18.8 (65.8)	13.0 (55.4)	7.1 (44.8)	15.9 (60.6)
Daily mean °C (°F)	0.9 (33.6)	1.3 (34.3)	4.4 (39.9)	9.6 (49.3)	14.6 (58.3)	18.3 (64.9)	22.0 (71.6)	23.5 (74.3)	20.3 (68.5)	14.8 (58.6)	8.8 (47.8)	3.4 (38.1)	11.8 (53.3)
Mean daily minimum °C (°F)	−2.1 (28.2)	−2.0 (28.4)	0.5 (32.9)	5.4 (41.7)	10.8 (51.4)	15.2 (59.4)	19.3 (66.7)	20.7 (69.3)	17.2 (63.0)	11.2 (52.2)	5.0 (41.0)	0.2 (32.4)	8.5 (47.2)
Record low °C (°F)	−9.6 (14.7)	−9.5 (14.9)	−6.2 (20.8)	−2.8 (27.0)	0.5 (32.9)	7.9 (46.2)	11.1 (52.0)	12.9 (55.2)	6.9 (44.4)	2.2 (36.0)	−3.1 (26.4)	−7.8 (18.0)	−9.6 (14.7)
Average precipitation mm (inches)	38.3 (1.51)	31.8 (1.25)	71.2 (2.80)	87.9 (3.46)	101.8 (4.01)	130.0 (5.12)	170.2 (6.70)	130.5 (5.14)	172.1 (6.78)	140.2 (5.52)	60.3 (2.37)	40.6 (1.60)	1,175 (46.26)
Average precipitation days (≥ 1.0 mm)	6.0	5.8	7.5	8.4	9.4	11.0	13.8	11.1	11.2	8.5	6.5	6.5	105.7
Mean monthly sunshine hours	153.5	161.1	182.4	193.1	190.1	145.3	134.9	149.8	135.0	144.8	143.3	133.2	1,871.3
Source: Japan Meteorological Agency

== Demographics ==
Per Japanese census data, the population of Shiogama peaked around 1990 and has declined since.

Historical population
Year	Pop.	±%
1970	59,772	—
1980	61,040	+2.1%
1990	62,025	+1.6%
2000	61,547	−0.8%
2010	56,490	−8.2%
2020	52,203	−7.6%

== Etymology ==
"Shiogama" means "salt furnace" and refers to a local Shinto ritual involving the making of salt from sea water, still performed every July. The name is sometimes written using the kanji 塩釜 rather than 塩竈 and both spellings are officially permitted. Both 釜 and 竈 are pronounced gama in compounds, but as lone words they are pronounced kama and kamado, respectively. A kamado (竈, "furnace") is what a kama (釜, "kettle") is placed upon, and so the two are not completely interchangeable. 塩竈 is the form officially used by the city, but for ease of writing, the 10-stroke 釜 is often used in place of the 21-stroke 竈, such as in Shiogama Station.

Shiogama Jinja uses the rendering 鹽竈, with an archaic character for salt. This third form is rarely seen outside of this context.

== History ==
The area of present-day Shiogama was part of ancient Mutsu Province, and has been settled since at least the Jōmon period by the Emishi people. During the Nara period, the area came under the control of colonists from the imperial dynasty based at nearby Tagajō and was the most important seaport in Mutsu. The ruins of the provincial capital of Mutsu Province have been found within the city borders. During later portion of the Heian period, the area was ruled by the Northern Fujiwara. During the Sengoku period, the area was contested by various samurai clans before the area came under the control of the Date clan of Sendai Domain during the Edo period, under the Tokugawa shogunate.

The town of Shiogama was established with the post-Meiji restoration creation of the modern municipalities system on April 1, 1889. Parts of Tagajō and Shichigahama were incorporated into Shiogama of September 1, 1938. Shiogama was raised to city status on November 23, 1941 (187th, nationally; 3rd in Miyagi). The city annexed the Gyūchi area of neighboring Tagajō on December 1, 1949 and the village of Urato on April 1, 1950.

The city was affected by the tsunami caused by the 2011 Tōhoku earthquake, although damage to its fishing industry turned out to be light.

== Government ==
Shiogama has a mayor-council form of government with a directly elected mayor and a unicameral city legislature of 18 members.

== Economy ==
The economy of Shiogama is largely based on commercial fishing, especially of tuna, and fish processing. The city also boasts one of the highest density of sushi restaurants in Japan.

Tourism is also a major part of the local economy of Shiogama City. Shiogama has both a morning tuna auction and fish market that are popular for both Japanese as well as international tourists. Entry to these markets are free with a wide variety of products, food, and tourism services available for purchase and reservation. Shiogama also boasts dozens of sushi restaurants and is known as one of the sushi capitals of Japan making it a draw for food tourism.

Shiogama City has benefited from an increase in foreign tourists in 2025 thanks to increasing numbers of tourists to the neighboring city of Sendai.

== Education ==
Shiogama has six public elementary schools and four middle schools operated by the city government, and one public high school operated by the Miyagi Prefectural Board of Education.

== Transportation ==
=== Railway ===
- East Japan Railway Company (JR East) – Senseki Line
  - Nishi-Shiogama, Hon-Shiogama, Higashi-Shiogama
- East Japan Railway Company (JR East) – Tōhoku Main Line
  - Shiogama

=== Highway ===
==== National highways ====
- National Route 45

=== Miyagi Prefectural Highways ===
- Miyagi Prefectural Route 3 (Shiogama—Yoshioka)
- Miyagi Prefectural Route 10 (Shiogama—Watari)
- Miyagi Prefectural Route 11 (Shiogama—Shiogama-kō)
- Miyagi Prefectural Route 23 (Sendai—Shiogama)
- Miyagi Prefectural Route 35 (Izumi—Shiogama)
- Miyagi Prefectural Route 58 (Shiogama—Shichigahama—Tagajō)

== Local attractions ==
=== Festivals ===
- Shiogama 'Hote' festival (10 March)
- Shiogama Flower festival and Shiogama Citizens Festival (late April)
- Shiogama Harbor festival (Eve: before Marine Day/festival: Marine Day July)

=== Specialties and crafts ===
- raw tuna (Maguro) catches in Japan
- Sushi restaurant density in Japan
- Sasa Kamaboko (fish paste and roasted into the shape of sasa (bamboo leaf)) processed fishery production in Japan
- Sweets (Shihogama, Namadora, etc.)
- Japanese sake (Shiogama brands: Uragasumi Zen, Omotaka Otokoyama, Shiki no Matsushima, Date no Iki, etc.)

== Visitor attractions ==
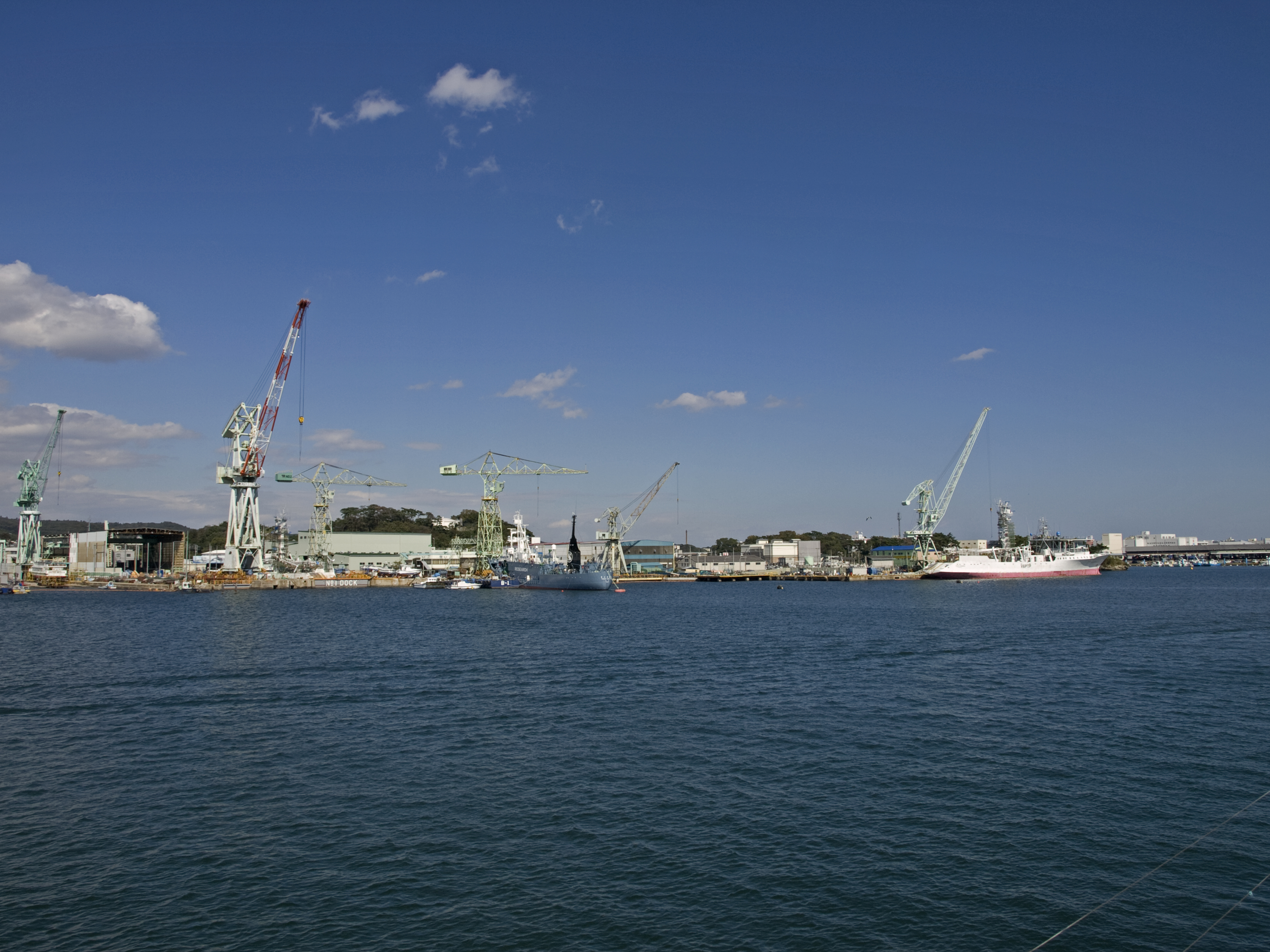
Port of Shiogama

- Shiogama Jinja
- Shiwahiko Jinja
- Okama Jinja
- Magaki Jinja
- Shiogama Port
- Shiogama Fish Market
- Urato Islands
- Nagai Shiyouiti Manga Museum

Shiogama-city Community Center (Fureai ESP Shiogama)

- Shiogama Kyokusui
- Noda no Tamagawa (One of Japan's six Tamagawa)
- Mother and child stone
- Marine Gate Shiogama

== Notable people from Shiogama ==
- Masao Maruyama (anime producer)
- Masashi Nakano (politician)
- Nobunaga Shimazaki (voice actor)
- Koichi Yamadera (voice actor)
