= Daigigakoi Shell Mound =

Archaeological type site

Daigigakoi Shell Midden
- 大木囲貝塚 (Japanese)
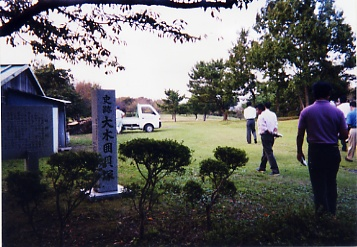
- Daigigakoi Shell Midden

- Location in Japan Daigigakoi Shell Mound (Japan)
- 38°18′10.9″N 141°2′37.9″E
- Type: shell midden, settlement
- Periods: Jōmon period
- Location: Shichigahama, Miyagi, Japan
- Region: Tōhoku region

Site notes
- Elevation: 35 m (115 ft)
- Length: 280 m (920 ft)
- Width: 270 m (890 ft)
- Area: 190,000 ha (470,000 acres)
- Owner: National Historic Site
- Public access: Yes

Daigigakoi Shell Midden (大木囲貝塚, Daigigakoi Kaizuka) is an archaeological site consisting of a Jōmon period Shell midden and the remains of an adjacent settlement located in what is now the town of Shichigahama, Miyagi Prefecture in the Tōhoku region of northern Japan. Due to the quantity, quality and variety of artifacts discovered, it has become a type site for the dating of Jōmon period remains in the southern Tōhoku region. It has been protected by the central government as a National Historic Site since 1968.

== Overview ==
During the early to middle Jōmon period (approximately 4000 to 2500 BC), sea levels were five to six meters higher than at present, and the ambient temperature was also 2 deg C higher. During this period, the Tōhoku region was inhabited by the Jōmon people, many of whom lived in coastal settlements. The middens associated with such settlements contain bone, botanical material, mollusc shells, sherds, lithics, and other artifacts and ecofacts associated with the now-vanished inhabitants, and these features, provide a useful source into the diets and habits of Jōmon society.

Most of these middens are found along the Pacific coast of Japan, and the rocky ria coast of Miyagi Prefecture was densely settled from the early through late Jōmon period. The Daigigakoi Shell Midden is located on the south shore of Matsushima Bay, at an elevation of approximately thirty-five meters from the present-day coastline. The midden is very large, extending for 270 meters east–west and 280 meters north–south, in a roughly horseshoe shape, indicating continuous usage over thousands of years. It is over two meters thick in places. In the central clearing, the remains of at least eight pit dwellings have been found.

A preliminary survey was conducted intermittently from 1917 to 1918, 1925 and 1927–1929. More comprehensive excavations were conducted in 1949, 1963 and 1965 by Tohoku University; and again from 1972 to 1981. Many of the artifacts found are housed in a local museum at the site. It is located about 10 minutes by car from Geba Station on the JR East Senseki Line.

== See also ==
- List of Historic Sites of Japan (Miyagi)
