= Shin-Rifu Station =

Railway station in Rifu, Miyagi Prefecture, Japan

Shin-Rifu Station 新利府駅
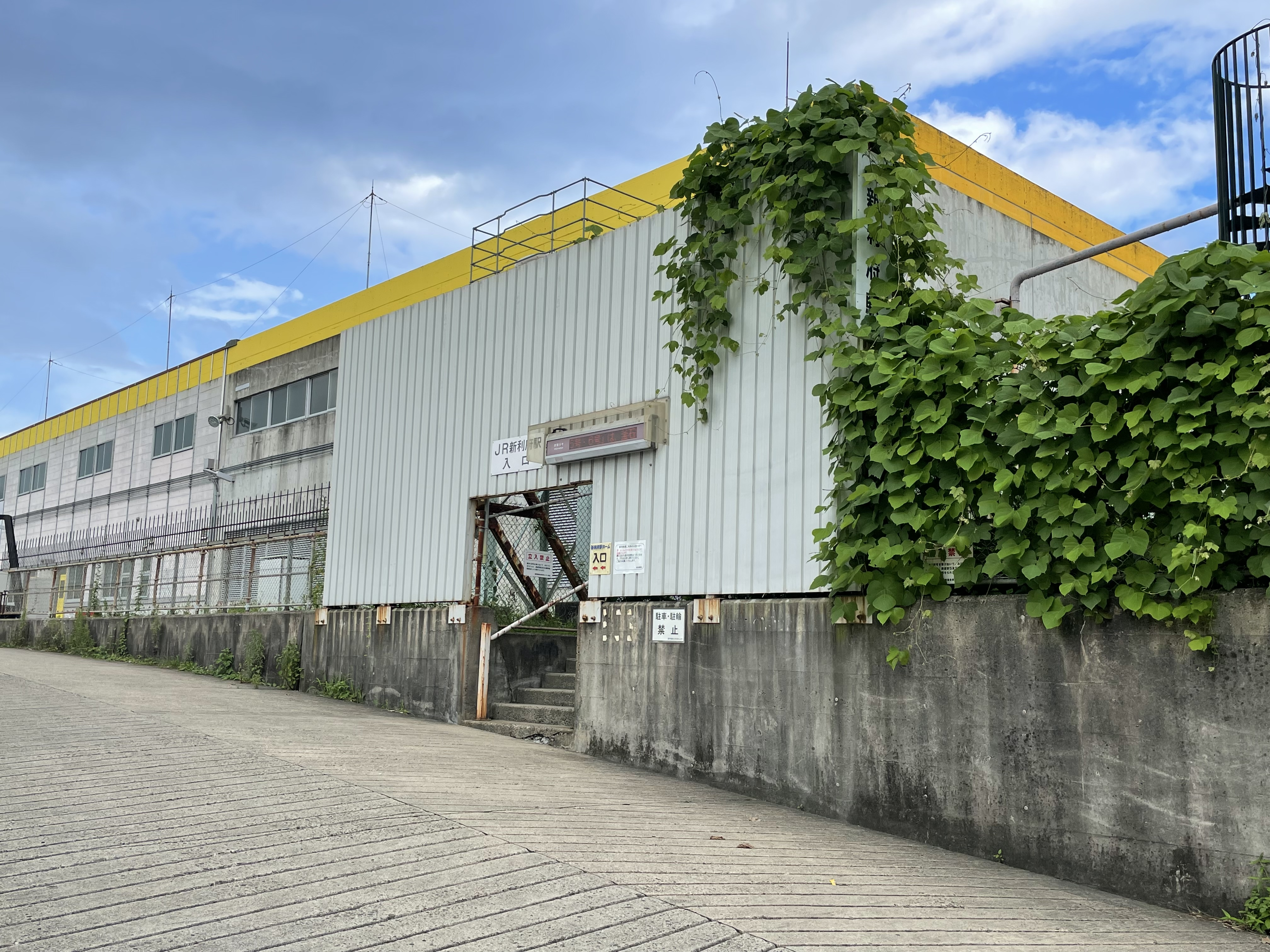
- Station entrance in July, 2022

General information
- Location: Yachiwaki, Rifu-cho, Miyagi-gun, Miyagi-ken 981-0100; Japan
- Coordinates: 38°19′2.22″N 140°58′22.92″E
- Operator: JR East
- Line: ■ Tōhoku Main Line (Rifu Branch)
- Distance: 2.5 km from Iwakiri
- Platforms: 1 side platform
- Tracks: 1

Other information
- Status: Unstaffed
- Website: Official website

History
- Opened: 1 April 1982

Services
Preceding station	JR East	Following station
Iwakiri Terminus	Tōhoku Main Line Rifu Branch	Rifu Terminus
Location
- Location within Miyagi Prefecture Location within Japan

Shin-Rifu Station (新利府駅, Shin-Rifu-eki) is a railway station in the town of Rifu, Miyagi, Japan, operated by East Japan Railway Company (JR East).

== Lines ==
Shin-Rifu Station is the only intermediate station on the Rifu Branch of the Tōhoku Main Line from Iwakiri Station to Rifu Station. It lies 2.5 km from Iwakiri Station. Most services operate through to and from Sendai Station.

== Station layout ==
The unstaffed station consists of one side platform served by the single track. Two entrances lead to the platform. one for general passengers, and one linking directly to the adjacent JR East Sendai General Shinkansen Depot for use by JR East employees only.

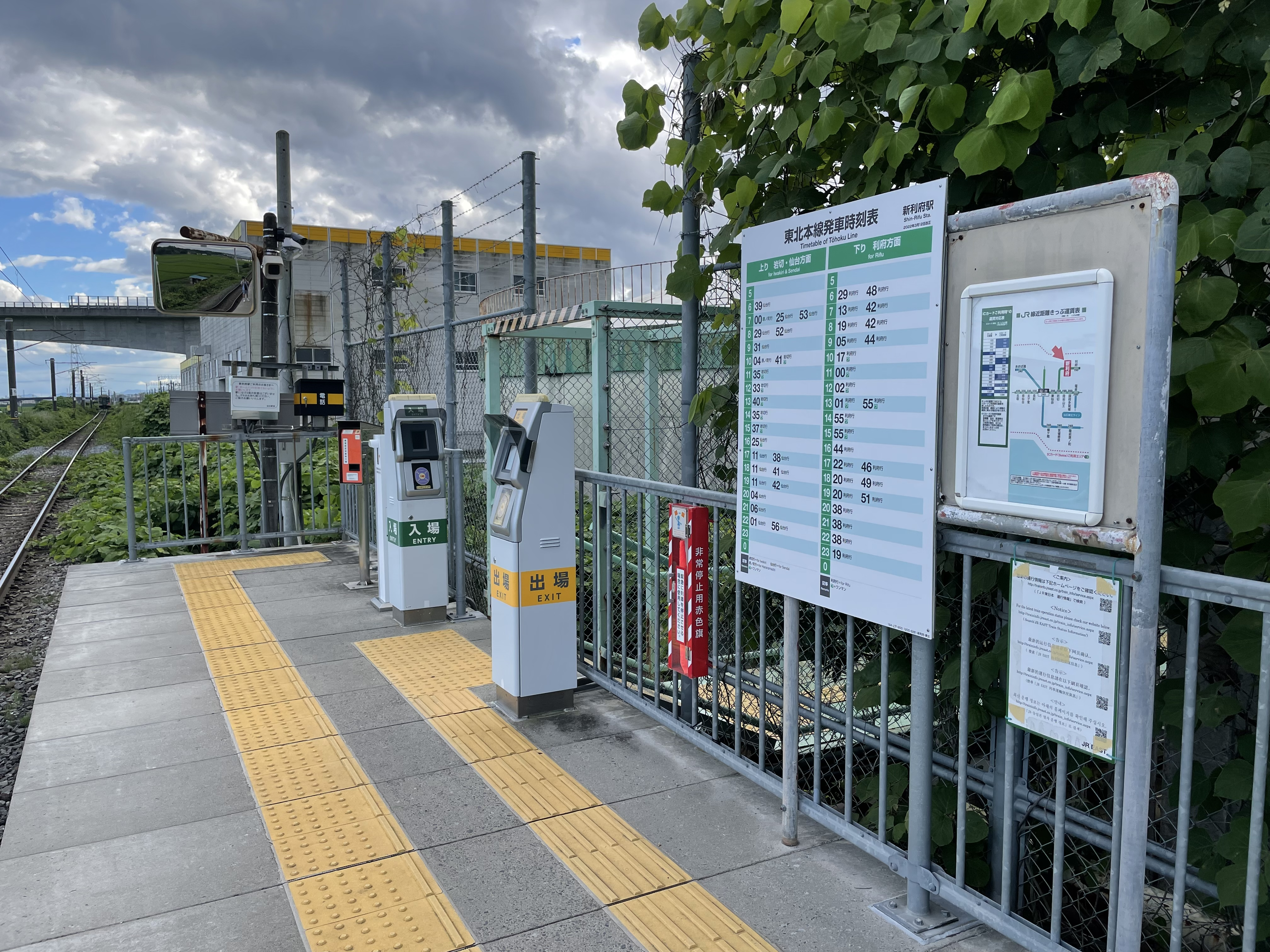
Ticket gate in July, 2022

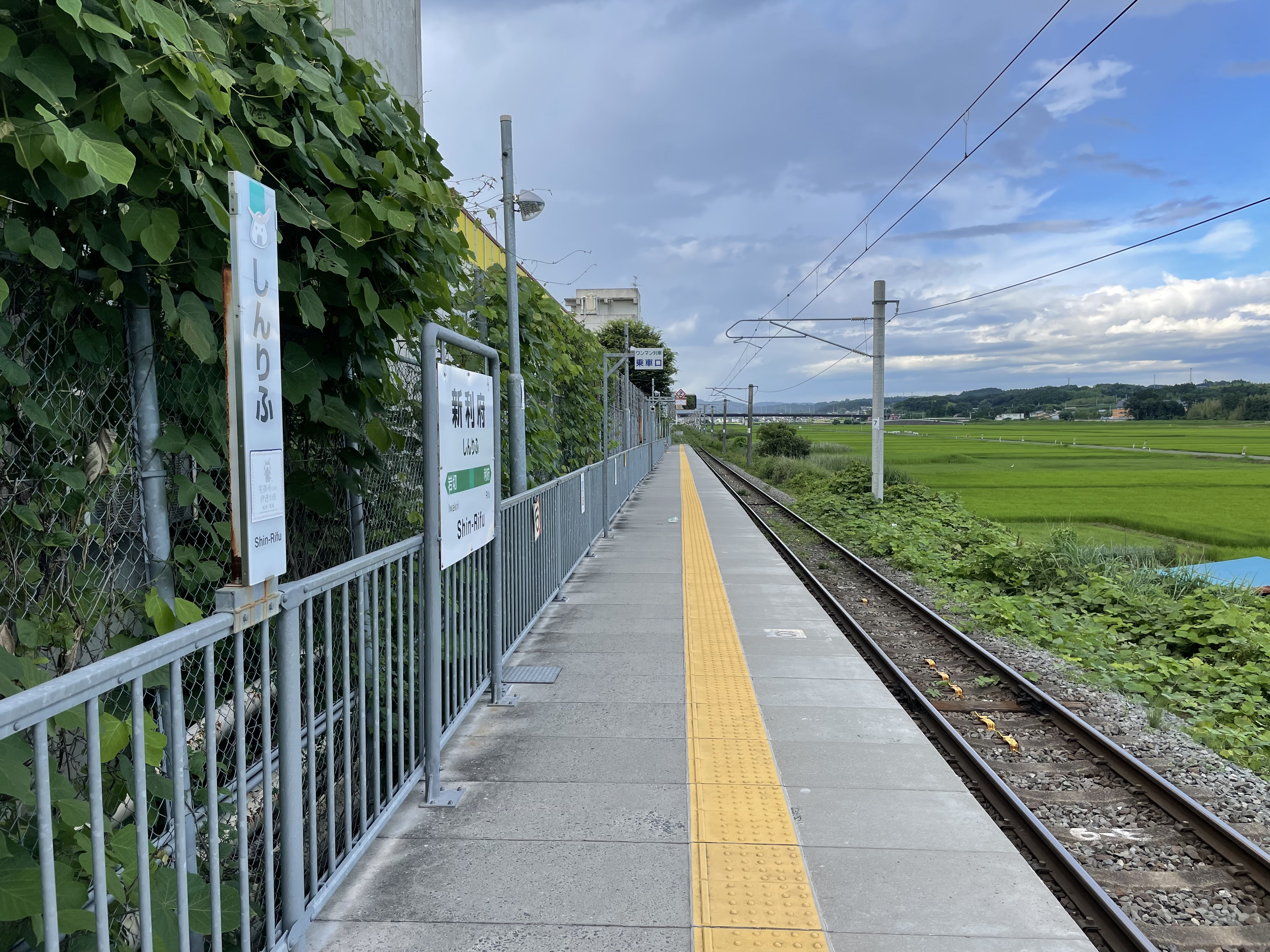
Platform in July, 2022

== History ==
The station opened on 1 April 1982. With the privatization of Japanese National Railways (JNR) on 1 April 1987, the station came under the control of JR East.

== Surrounding area ==
The station is primarily used by employees at the adjacent JR East Sendai General Shinkansen Depot.

== See also ==
- List of railway stations in Japan
