= Sendai Thermal Power Station =

Thermal power station in Shichigahama, Miyagi, Japan

Sendai Thermal Power Station 仙台火力発電所
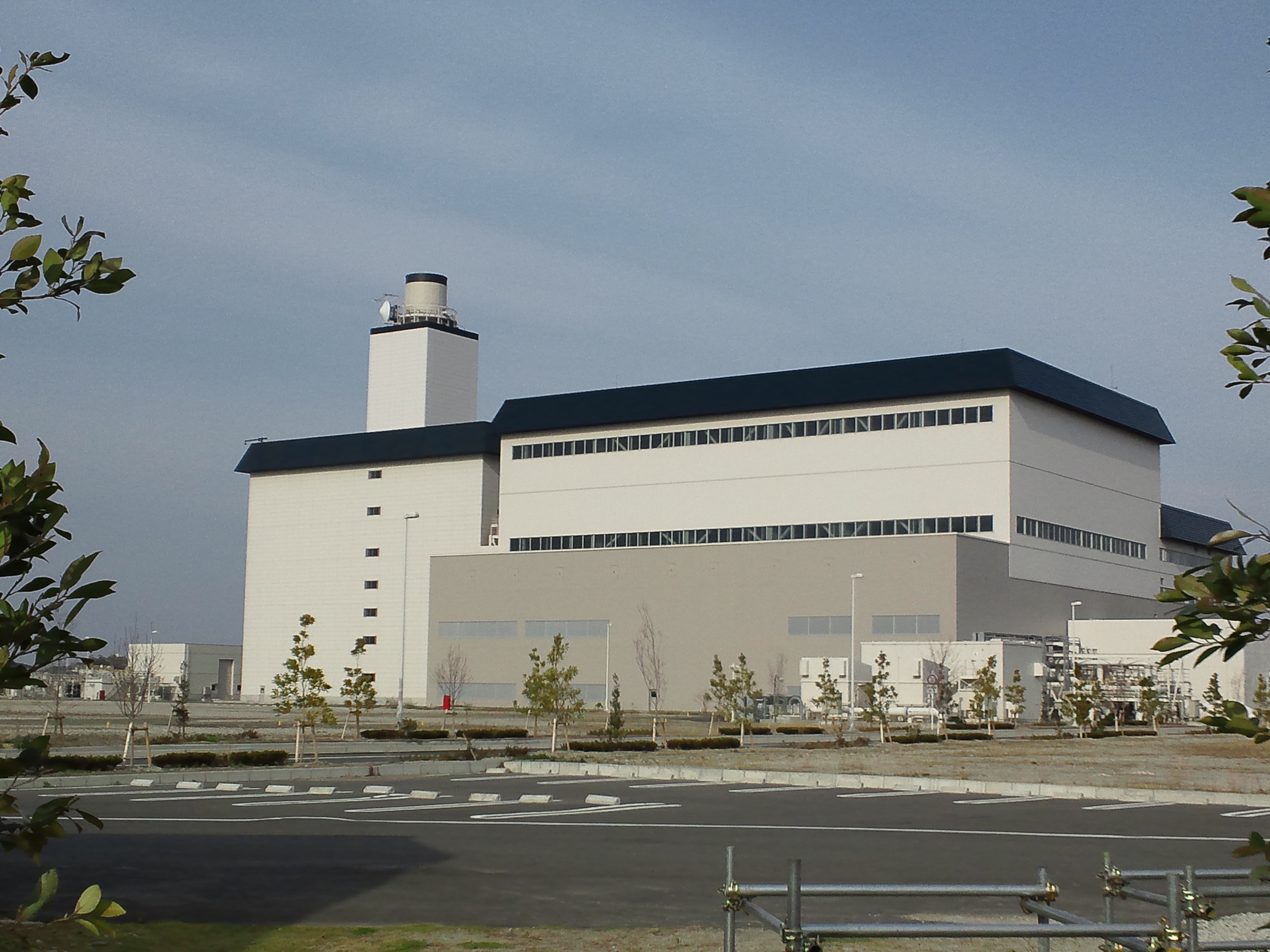
- Sendai Thermal Power Station
- Country: Japan Miyagi Prefecture#Japan
- Location: Shichigahama, Miyagi, Japan
- Coordinates: 38°19′1.7″N 141°04′24.4″E
- Status: Operational
- Commission date: 2011
- Owner: Tohoku Electric
- Operator: Tohoku Electric Power

Thermal power station
- Primary fuel: LNG

Power generation
- Units operational: 1
- Units decommissioned: 3
- Nameplate capacity: 468 MW

External links
- Commons: Related media on Commons

Sendai Thermal Power Station (仙台火力発電所, Sendai Karyoku Hatsudensho) is an LNG-fired thermal power station operated by Tohoku Electric in the town of Shichigahama, Miyagi, Japan. The facility is located on Matsushima Bay along the Pacific coast of Honshu.

== History ==
The Sendai Thermal Power Station was built in 1959 to supply power to the Sendai metropolis and surrounding Miyagi Prefecture. Unit 1 came online in October 1959. Unit 2 was completed in November 1960 and Unit 3 in June 1962. Initially, all three units burned coal; however, Unit 1 was subsequently modified to burn heavy oil instead.

Unit 3 was abolished in March 2004 and Units 1 and 2 in August 2007, and replaced by the single combined cycle Unit 4, in order to reduce carbon emissions and lower operating costs, which came on line in July 2010.

Operations were temporarily suspended due to damage caused by the Tōhoku earthquake and tsunami in March 2011, but test operations were resumed on December 20 and full output was restored by February 8, 2012. From April 1, 2017, the rated output of Unit 4 was upgraded from 446,000 kW to 468,000 kW due to operational experience and software modifications.

The site of Units 1, 2 and 3 are now occupied by the 2 MW capacity Sendai Solar Power Plant, which started operation on May 25, 2012.

== Plant details ==
Unit	Fuel	Type	Capacity	On line	Status
1	Coal, Heavy Oil	Steam turbine	175 MW	1959	Decommissioned 2007; scrapped
2	Coal	Steam turbine	175 MW	1960	Decommissioned 2007; scrapped
3	Coal	Steam turbine	175 MW	1962	Decommissioned 2004; scrapped
4	LNG	ACC	468 MW	2010	operational

== See also ==
- Energy in Japan
- List of power stations in Japan
