= Iwakiri Station =

Railway station in Sendai, Japan

Iwakiri Station 岩切駅
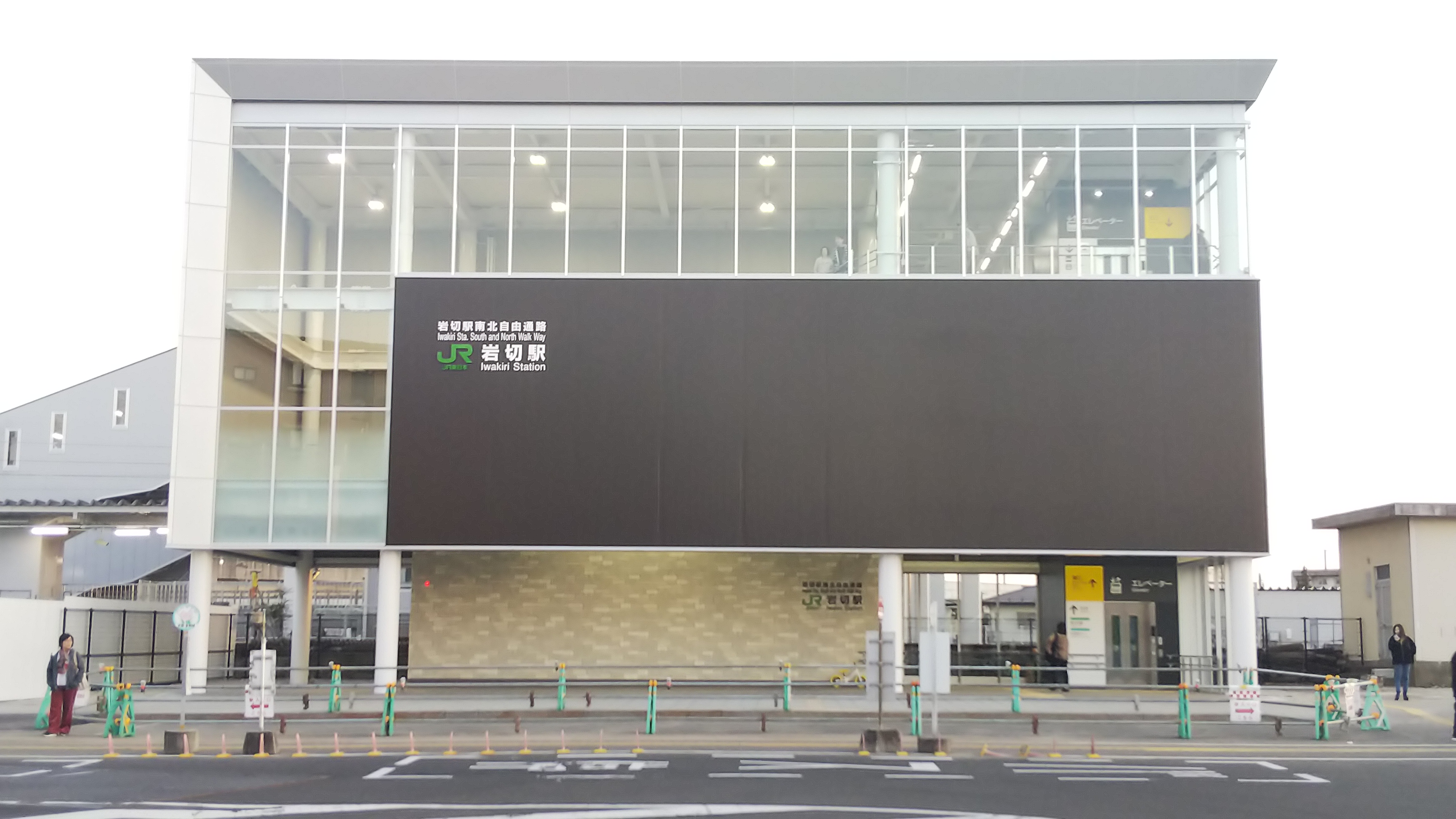
- Iwakiri Station north entrance in November 2018

General information
- Location: Donokuchi Iwakiri, Miyagino-ku, Sendai-shi, Miyagi-ken 983-0821; Japan
- Coordinates: 38.3012°N 140.9560°E
- Operator: JR East; JR Freight
- Line: ■ Tōhoku Main Line
- Distance: 359.9 km from Tokyo
- Platforms: 2 island platforms
- Tracks: 4
- Connections: Bus terminal

Construction
- Structure type: At grade

Other information
- Status: Staffed (Midori no Madoguchi)
- Website: Official website

History
- Opened: 11 October 1888

Passengers
- FY2018: 4,610 daily

Services
| Preceding station | JR East | Following station |
|---|---|---|
| Higashi-Sendai towards Kuroiso | Tōhoku Main Line Local | Rikuzen-Sannō towards Morioka |
| Terminus | Tōhoku Main Line Rifu Branch | Shin-Rifu towards Rifu |
| Higashi-Sendai towards Sendai | Senseki-Tōhoku Line Rapid | Rikuzen-Sannō towards Ishinomaki |
Location
- Location within Miyagi Prefecture Location within Japan

Iwakiri Station (岩切駅, Iwakiri-eki) is a junction railway station in Miyagino-ku, Sendai, Miyagi, Japan, operated by East Japan Railway Company (JR East). The station also has a freight depot for the Japan Freight Railway Company (JR Freight).

== Lines ==
Iwakiri station is served by the Tōhoku Main Line and is located at starting point for the junction for the Rifu Branch Line to Rifu. It is 359.9 km from Tokyo Station.

== Station layout ==
The station has two island platforms connected by an underground passageway. The station has a Midori no Madoguchi staffed ticket office.

=== Platforms ===
| 1 | ■ Tōhoku Main Line | for Rifu |
| 2 | ■ Tōhoku Main Line | for Sendai (trains starting at Rifu) |
| 3 | ■ Tōhoku Main Line | for Ichinoseki, Matsushima, and Kogota |
| 4 | ■ Tōhoku Main Line | for Sendai |

== History ==
The station opened on 11 October 1888. The station was absorbed into the JR East network upon the privatization of the Japanese National Railways (JNR) on 1 April 1987.

== Passenger statistics ==
In fiscal 2018, the station was used by an average of 4,610 passengers daily (boarding passengers only). The passenger figures for previous years are as shown below.

| Fiscal year | Daily average |
|---|---|
| 2000 | 3,253 |
| 2005 | 3,602 |
| 2010 | 3,984 |
| 2015 | 4,534 |

== Surrounding area ==
- Sendai City Iwakiri Junior High School

== See also ==
- List of railway stations in Japan
