= Rifu =

Rifu 利府町
- Town
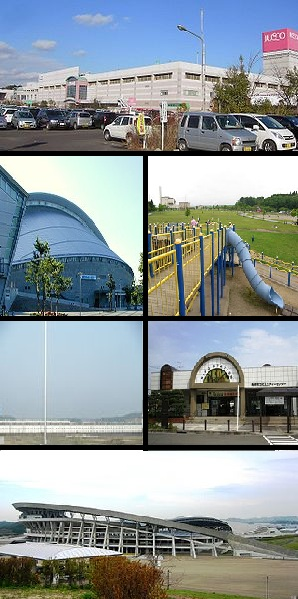
- 1=Aeon Rifu, 2=Miyagi Athletic Park Gymnasium, Kaseinuma Park, 3=Shinkansen Maintenance Center, Rifu Station, 4=Miyagi Stadium

- Flag Seal

- Location of Rifu in Miyagi Prefecture

- Coordinates: 38°19′58.3″N 140°58′37.8″E
- Country: Japan
- Region: Tōhoku
- Prefecture: Miyagi
- District: Miyagi

Area
  - Total: 44.89 km^{2} (17.33 sq mi)

Population (June 1, 2020)
  - Total: 36,014
  - Density: 802.3/km^{2} (2,078/sq mi)
- Time zone: UTC+9 (Japan Standard Time)
- Tree: Live oak
- Flower: Nashi pear
- Phone number: 022-767-2111
- Address: Rifu Shinnamimatsu 4, Rifu-chō, Miyagi-gun, Miyagi-ken 981-0112
- Website: Official website

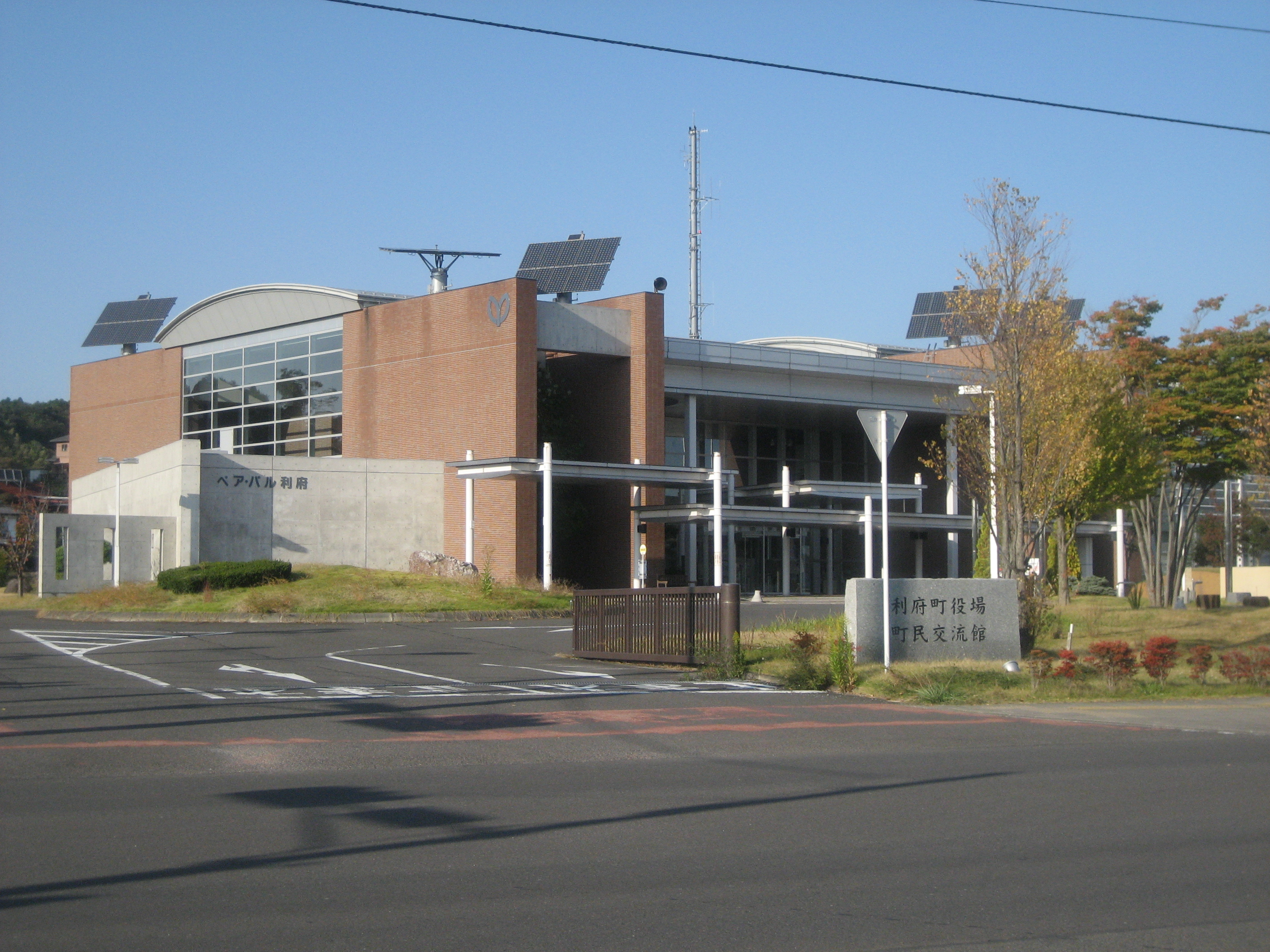
Rifu town hall

Rifu (利府町, Rifu-chō) is a town located in Miyagi Prefecture, Japan. As of 1 June 2020, the town had an estimated population of 36,014, and a population density of 800 persons per km^{2} in 13,568 households. The total area of the town is 44.89 square kilometres (17.33 sq mi). Rifu is known for its nashi pears. Recently, wine and candy made from nashi pears have been developed in the town.

== Geography ==
Rifu is located in east-central Miyagi Prefecture, bordered by Sendai metropolis to the south and by Matsushima Bay to the east.

=== Neighboring municipalities ===
Miyagi Prefecture

- Matsushima
- Ōsato
- Sendai
- Shiogama
- Tagajō
- Taiwa
- Tomiya

=== Climate ===
Rifu has a humid subtropical climate (Köppen climate classification Cfa) characterized by mild summers and cold winters. The average annual temperature in Rifu is 11.9 °C. The average annual rainfall is 1237 mm with September as the wettest month. The temperatures are highest on average in August, at around 24.4 °C, and lowest in January, at around 0.6 °C.

=== Demographics ===
Per Japanese census data, the population of Rifu has increased rapidly over the past 50 years.

Historical population
Year	Pop.	±%
1920	4,718	—
1930	5,211	+10.4%
1940	5,598	+7.4%
1950	7,764	+38.7%
1960	7,927	+2.1%
1970	8,031	+1.3%
1980	11,201	+39.5%
1990	16,321	+45.7%
2000	29,848	+82.9%
2010	33,944	+13.7%
2020	35,182	+3.6%

== History ==
The area of present-day Rifu was part of ancient Mutsu Province, and has been settled since at least the Jōmon period by the Emishi people. With the establishment of Tagajō in the Nara period, Rifu was part of the central Yamato colonization area in the region. During the Sengoku period, the area was contested by various samurai clans before the area came under the control of the Date clan of Sendai Domain during the Edo period, under the Tokugawa shogunate.

The village of Rifu was established on June 1, 1889 with post-Meiji restoration establishment of the modern municipalities system. It was raised to town status on October 1, 1967.

== Government ==
Rifu has a mayor-council form of government with a directly elected mayor and a unicameral town council of 18 members. Rifu, together with the rest of Miyagi District collectively contributes one seat to the Miyagi Prefectural legislature. In terms of national politics, the town is part of Miyagi 4th district of the lower house of the Diet of Japan.

== Economy ==
The economy of Rifu is largely based on agriculture, primarily horticulture and the cultivation of rice. East Japan Railway Company's Sendai Shinkansen maintenance depot is located in Rifu.

== Education ==
Rifu has six public elementary schools and three public junior high schools operated by the town government. The town has one public high school operated by the Miyagi Prefectural Board of Education. The prefecture also operates one special education school for the handicapped.

== Transportation ==
=== Railway ===
East Japan Railway Company (JR East) - Senseki Line

- Rikuzen-Hamada

East Japan Railway Company (JR East) - Tōhoku Main Line

- Shin-Rifu – Rifu

=== Highway ===
- Sanriku Expressway – Rifu-Shiogama, Rifu-Naka, Matsushima-Kaigan interchanges; Rifu Junction
- Sendai-Hokubu Road – Rifu Junction, Rifu-Shirakashidai Interchange
- National Route 45

== Local attractions ==
- Miyagi Stadium
- Site of Rifu Castle

== Sister cities ==
- Lifou Island, New Caledonia, France, since September 4, 1980.

== Noted people from Rifu ==
- Tsukasa Fujimoto, professional wrestler and actress
- Hisashi Kato, professional soccer player

== In popular media ==
In the film Bullet Train Explosion, East Japan Railway Company's Sendai Shinkansen maintenance depot has been featured.
