= Rifu Station =

Railway station in Miyagi Prefecture, Japan

Rifu Station 利府駅
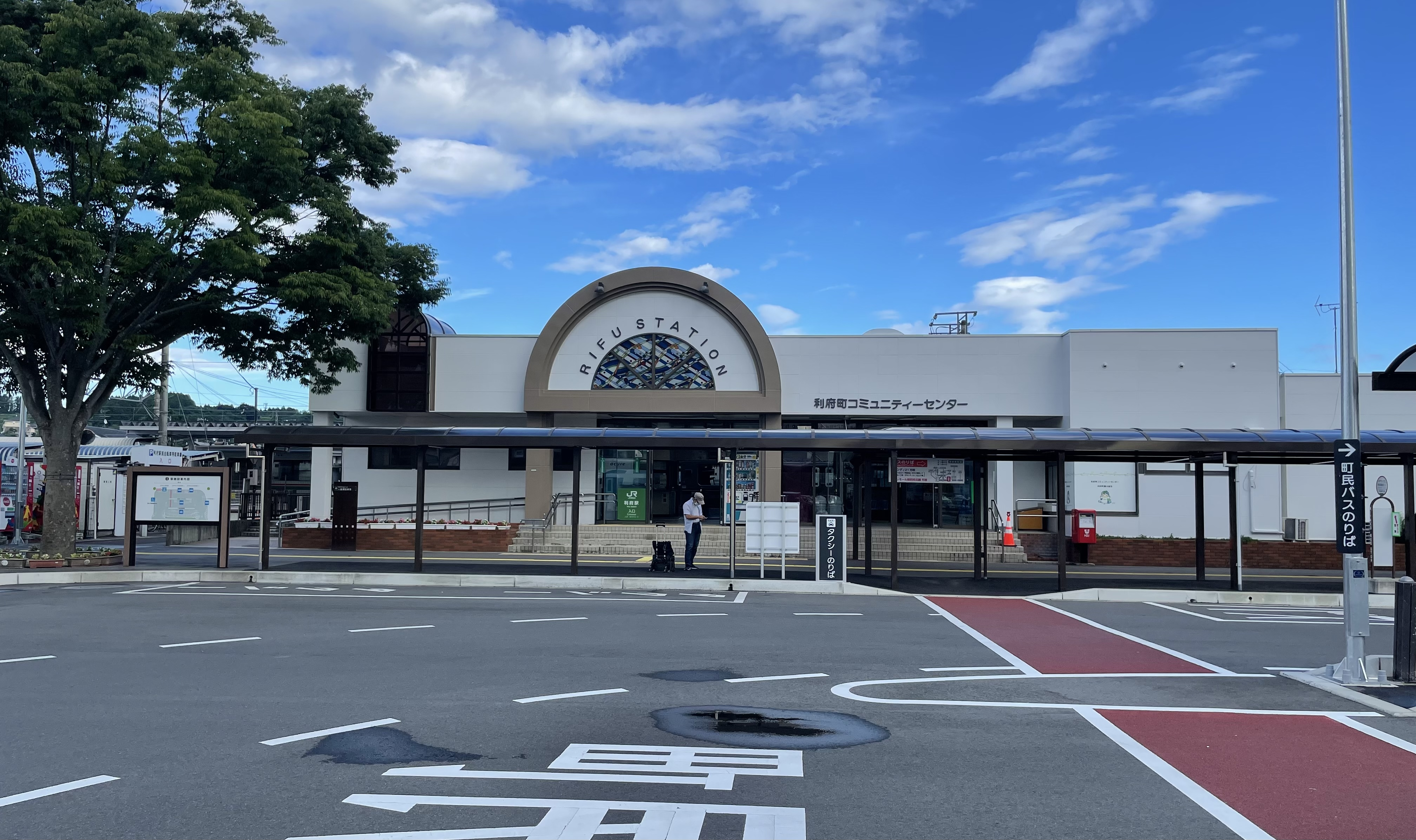
- Rifu Station in July 2022

General information
- Location: Mori-gou, Sumita, Rifu-chō, Miyagi-gun, Miyagi-ken 981-0103; Japan
- Coordinates: 38°19′44.88″N 140°59′4.36″E
- Operator: JR East
- Line: ■ Tōhoku Main Line (Rifu Branch)
- Distance: 4.2 km from Iwakiri
- Platforms: 1 bay platform
- Tracks: 2

Other information
- Status: Staffed
- Website: Official website

History
- Opened: 4 January 1894

Passengers
- FY2018: 2,793

Services
Preceding station	JR East	Following station
Shin-Rifu towards Iwakiri	Tōhoku Main Line Rifu Branch	Terminus
Location
- Location within Miyagi Prefecture Location within Japan

Rifu Station (利府駅, Rifu-eki) is a railway station on the Tōhoku Main Line in the town of Rifu, Miyagi, Japan, operated by East Japan Railway Company (JR East).

== Lines ==
Rifu Station is the terminus of the 4.3-kilometer Rifu Branch of the Tōhoku Main Line from Iwakiri Station. Most services operate to and from Sendai Station.

== Station layout ==
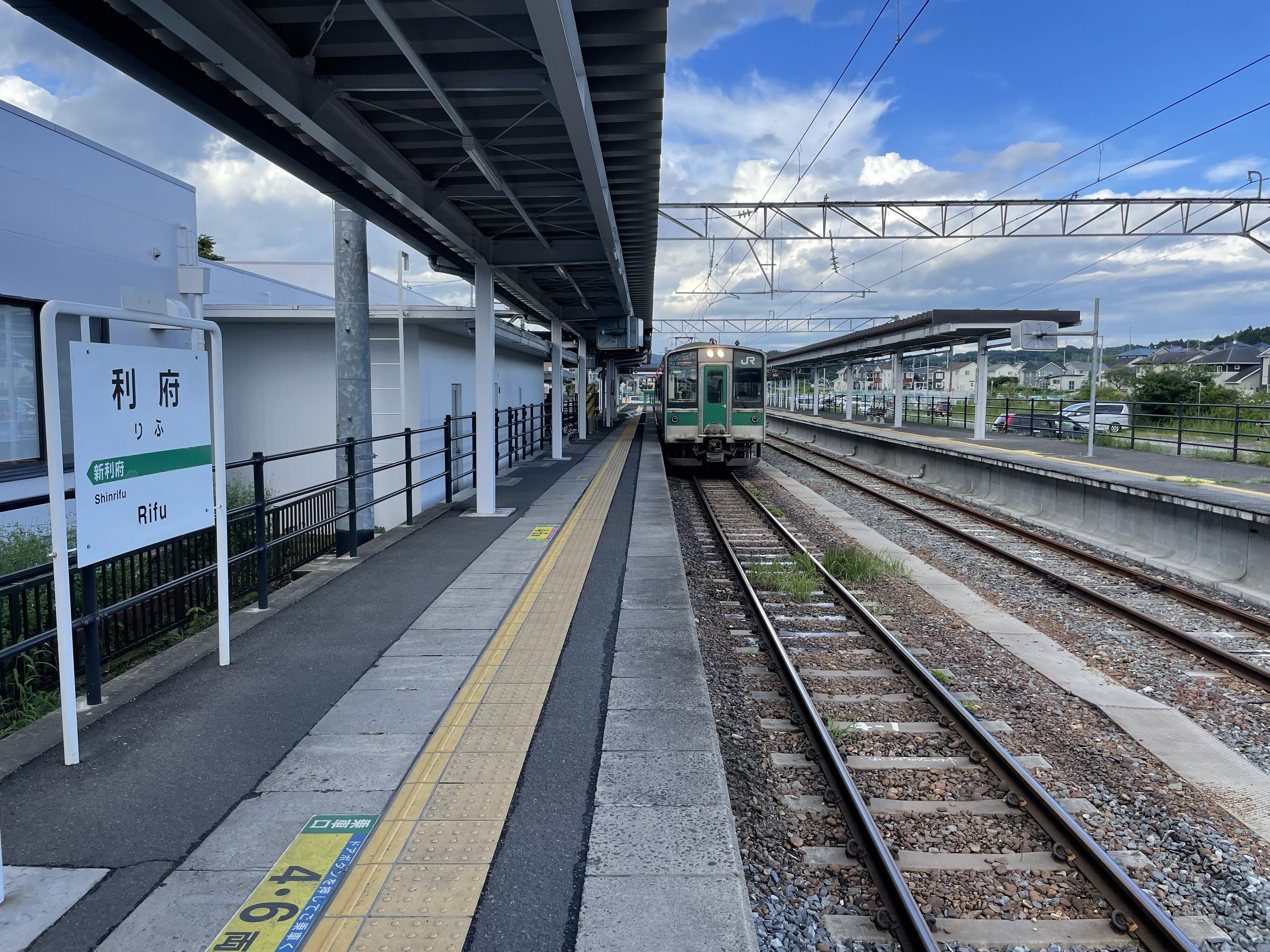
View of the platforms, July 2022

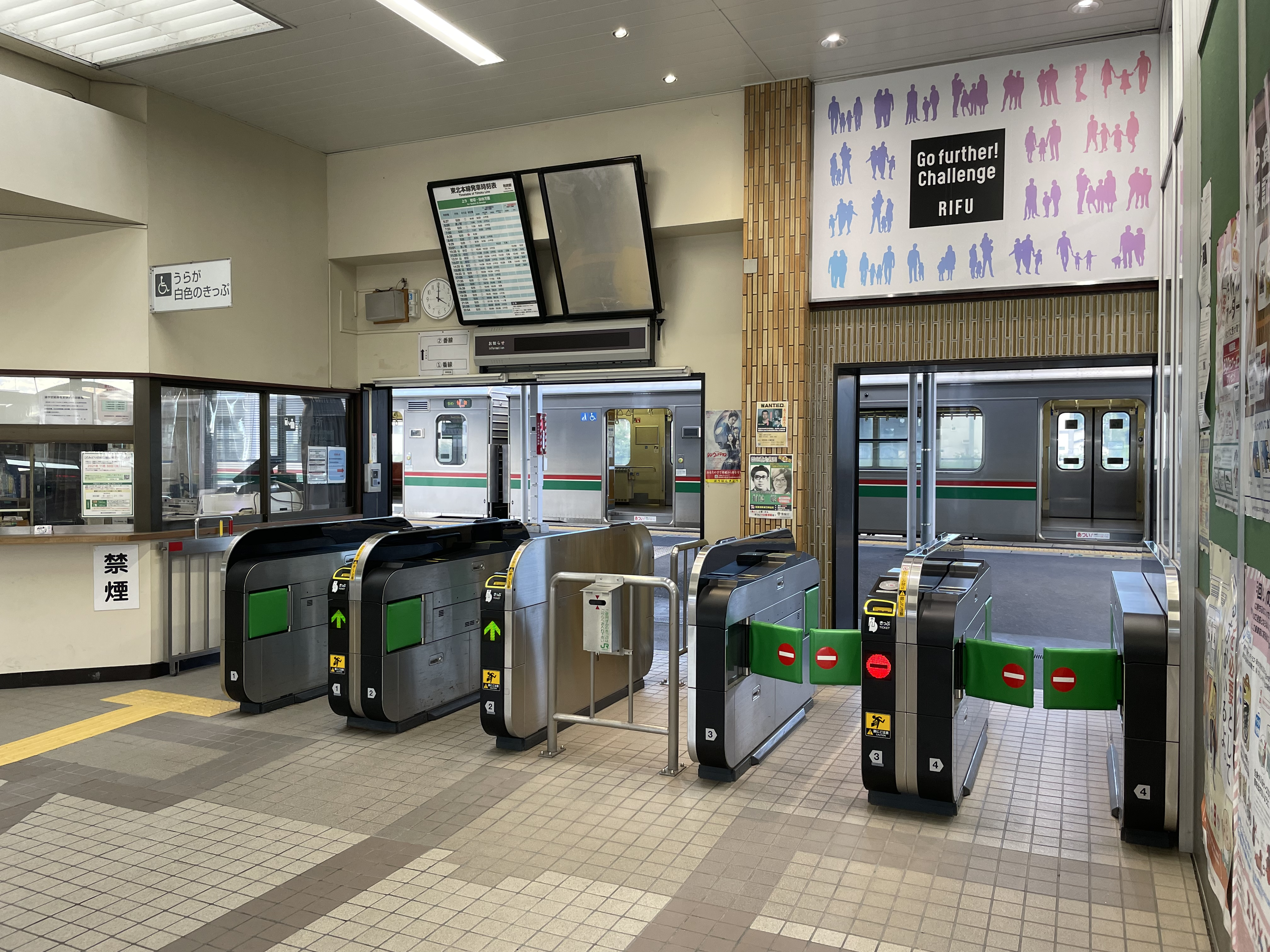
Ticket gates, July 2022

Rifu Station has a bay platform. and staffed ticket counter.

== History ==
The station opened on 4 January 1894 as an intermediate station on the Yama Line to Matsushima. On 1 July 1962, services between Rifu Station and Matsushima Station were discontinued, with Rifu becoming a terminus station. From 2 July 1978, the Rifu branch line from Iwakiri was electrified at 20 kV AC. In 2002, a second platform was constructed to handle the additional passenger traffic during the 2002 FIFA World Cup held at the nearby Miyagi Stadium.

== Passenger statistics ==
In fiscal 2018, the station was used by an average of 2,793 passengers daily (boarding passengers only).

== Surrounding area ==
- Miyagi Stadium
- JR East Sendai General Shinkansen Depot

== See also ==
- List of railway stations in Japan
