= Tagajō =

Tagajō 多賀城市
- City
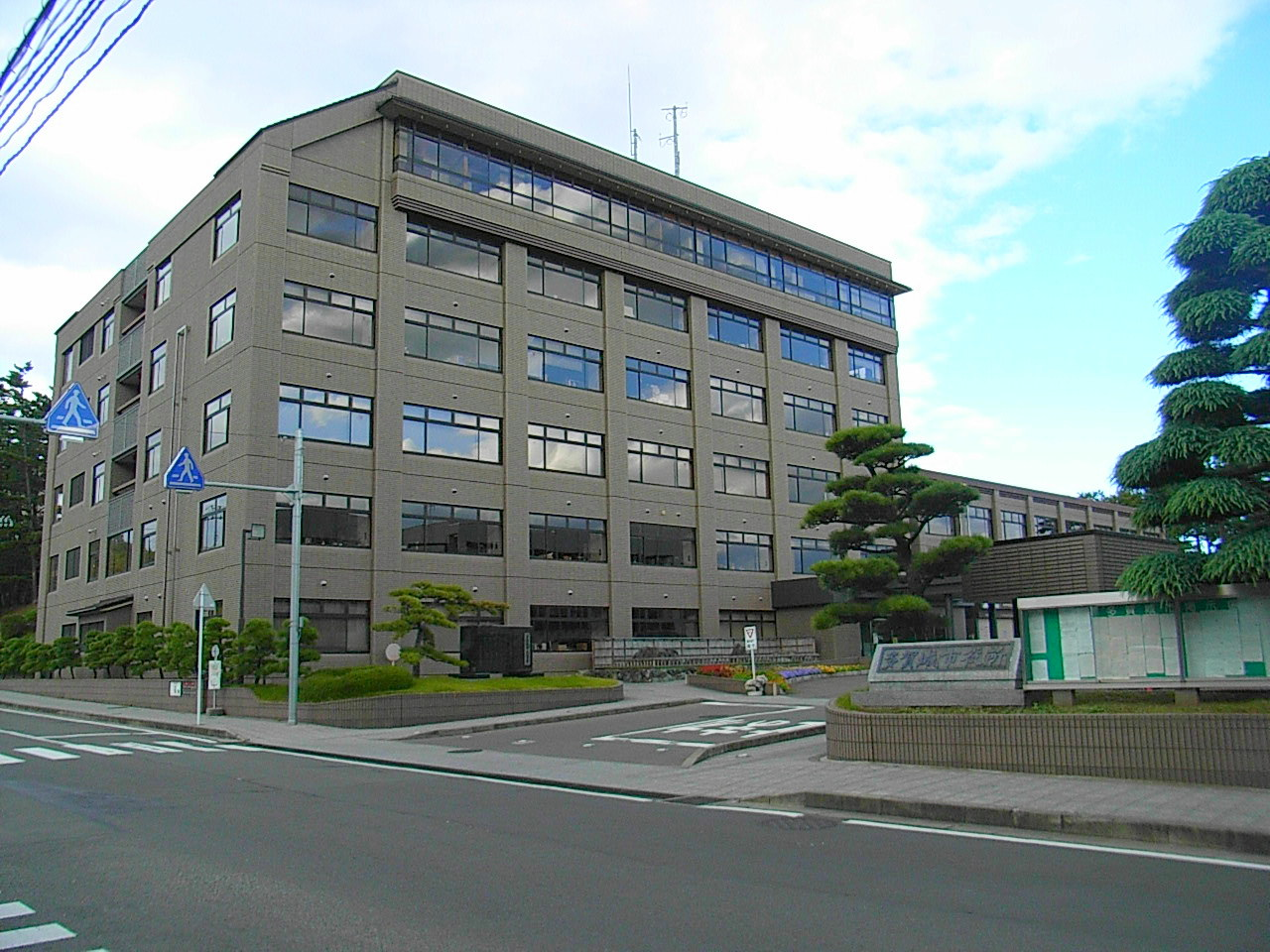
- Tagajō City Hall

- Flag Emblem

- Location of Tagajō in Miyagi Prefecture

- Coordinates: 38°17′37.8″N 141°0′15.3″E
- Country: Japan
- Region: Tōhoku
- Prefecture: Miyagi
- First official recorded: 7th century AD
- City settled: November 1, 1971

Government
  - Mayor: Kōsuke Fukaya (from October 2020)

Area
  - Total: 19.69 km^{2} (7.60 sq mi)

Population (June 1, 2020)
  - Total: 62,869
  - Density: 3,193/km^{2} (8,270/sq mi)
- Time zone: UTC+9 (Japan Standard Time)
- Tree: Camellia sasanqua
- Flower: Iris sanguinea
- Phone number: 022-368-1141
- Address: 1-1 Chūō 2-chōme, Tagajō-shi, Miyagi-ken 985-8531
- Website: Official website

Tagajō (多賀城市, Tagajō-shi) is a city located in Miyagi Prefecture, Japan. As of 1 June 2020, the city had an estimated population of 62,869 in 27,869 households, and a population density of 3,200 people per km^{2}. The total area of the city is 19.64 square kilometres (7.58 sq mi). The city was named after Taga Castle, the capital of Mutsu Province from the Nara period.

== Geography ==
Tagajō is in the coastal plains of east-central Miyagi Prefecture, bordered by the Pacific Ocean to the east.

=== Neighboring municipalities ===
Miyagi Prefecture

- Rifu
- Sendai
- Shichigahama
- Shiogama

== Climate ==
Tagajō has a humid subtropical climate (Köppen climate classification Cfa) characterized by mild summers and cold winters. The average annual temperature in Tagajō is 12.3 °C. The average annual rainfall is 1225 mm with September as the wettest month. The temperatures are highest on average in August, at around 24.8 °C, and lowest in January, at around 1.1 °C.

== Demographics ==
Per Japanese census data, the population of Tagajō has recently plateaued after a long period of growth.

Historical population
Year	Pop.	±%
1940	8,199	—
1950	14,659	+78.8%
1960	21,047	+43.6%
1970	36,677	+74.3%
1980	50,785	+38.5%
1990	60,625	+19.4%
2000	61,457	+1.4%
2010	63,060	+2.6%
2020	62,827	−0.4%

== History ==
The area of present-day Tagajō was part of ancient Mutsu Province, and has been settled since at least the Jōmon period by the Emishi people. Per the Shoku Nihongi, following a huge earthquake in the year 715 AD, a large number of people migrated to this area from the southern Kantō region, forming numerous fortified settlements in the hinterland. In 729 AD, a large fortified settlement, Taga Castle, was established by the imperial dynasty as a military center to establish control over the region and to protect these colonists. The fortification became the administrative capital of Mutsu Province under the Ritsuryō system. The tsunami in 869 caused extensive flooding of the Sendai plain, destroying the town of Tagajō. Archaeological investigations have identified the remains of 8th and 9th century buildings beneath the present town, covered by sediments dated to the middle of the 10th century.

During the later portion of the Heian period, the area was ruled by the Northern Fujiwara. During the Sengoku period, the area was contested by various samurai clans before the area came under the control of the Date clan of Sendai Domain during the Edo period, under the Tokugawa shogunate.

After the start of the Meiji period, the modern village of Tagajō was established with the creation of the municipalities system on April 1, 1889. From 1945 to 1954, a United States Army base, Camp Loper, was located in the town. Tagajō was elevated to town status on July 1, 1951. In the mid-1960s, the town was designated as an industrial development zone due to its proximity to Sendai harbor. Tagajō was designated a city on November 1, 1971. The city was seriously affected by the tsunami caused by the 2011 Tōhoku earthquake. As of April 7, 2011, 177 people were known dead, with 15 missing. 1,811 people were living in shelters.

== Government ==
Tagajō has a mayor-council form of government with a directly elected mayor and a unicameral city legislature of 18 members. Tagajō, together with the town of Shichigahama, contributes two seats to the Miyagi Prefectural legislature. In terms of national politics, the city is part of Miyagi 4th district of the lower house of the Diet of Japan.

== Economy ==
Sony operates the Sendai Technology Center in Tagajō.

== Education ==
- Tohoku Gakuin University – Tagajō campus
- Tagajō has six public elementary schools and five public junior high schools operated by the city government and two public high schools operated by the Miyagi Prefectural Board of Education. There is also one private high school.

== Transportation ==
=== Railway ===
East Japan Railway Company (JR East) - Tōhoku Main Line

- Rikuzen-Sannō - Kokufu-Tagajō

East Japan Railway Company (JR East) - Senseki Line

- Tagajō - Geba

=== Highway ===
- Sanriku Expressway
- National Route 45

== Local attractions ==
- Taga Castle ruins, a Special National Historic Site
- Tōhoku History Museum

== International relations ==
=== Sister cities ===
Tagajō is twinned with:

- Dazaifu, Fukuoka, Japan (2005)
- Tendō, Yamagata, Japan (2006)
- Nara, Nara, Japan (2010)

== Notable people ==
- Yudai Chiba, actor
- Taiji Ishimori, professional wrestler
