= Shichigahama =

Town in Miyagi Prefecture, Japan

Shichigahama 七ヶ浜町
- Town
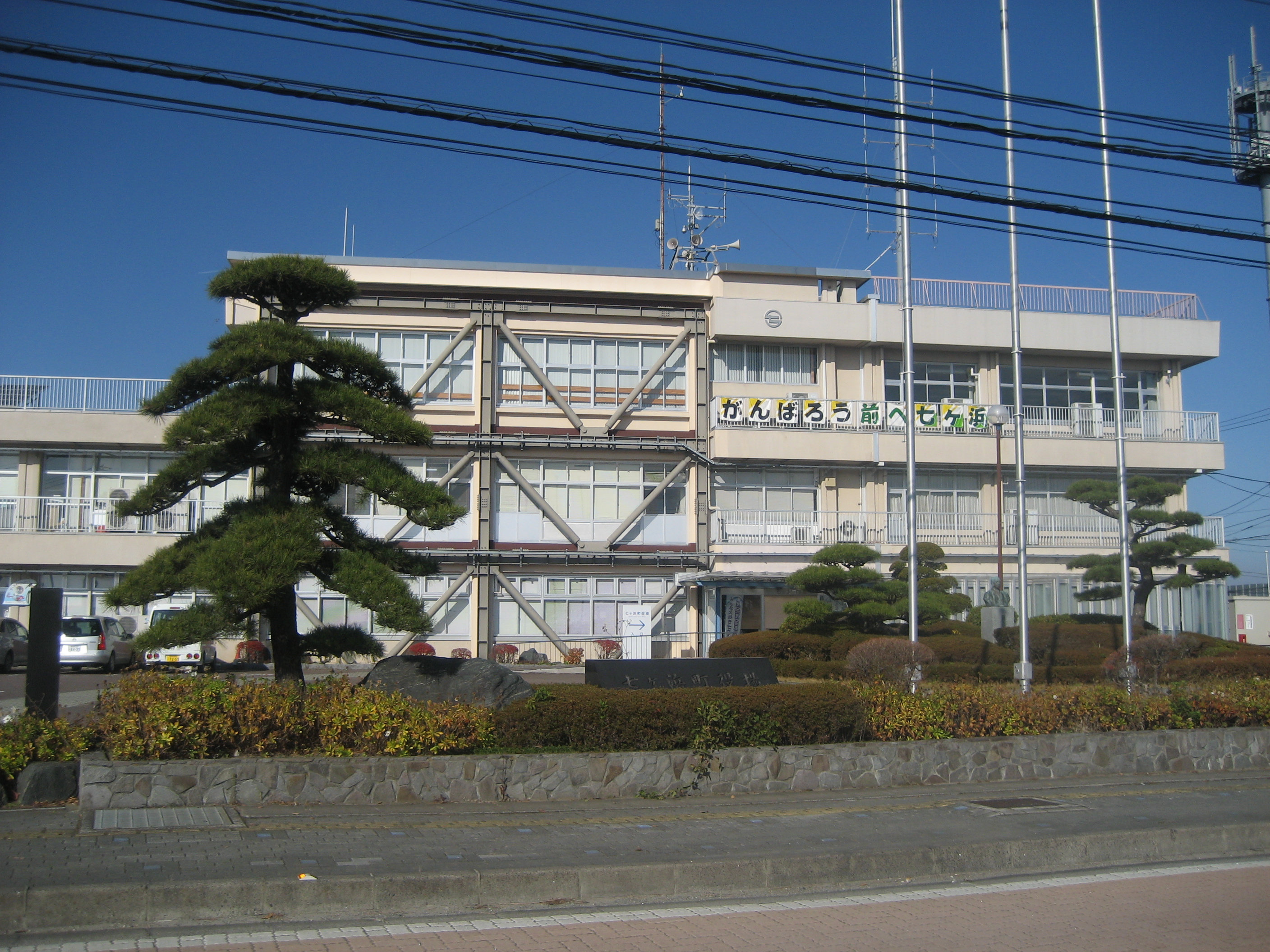
- Shichigahama Town Hall

- Flag Seal

- Location of Shichigahama in Miyagi Prefecture

- Coordinates: 38°18′16.3″N 141°03′32.9″E
- Country: Japan
- Region: Tōhoku
- Prefecture: Miyagi
- District: Miyagi

Area
  - Total: 13.19 km^{2} (5.09 sq mi)

Population (June 1, 2020)
  - Total: 18,447
  - Density: 1,399/km^{2} (3,622/sq mi)
- Time zone: UTC+9 (Japan Standard Time)
- Tree: Pinus thunbergii
- Flower: Hamagiku
- Phone number: 022-357-2111
- Address: 5-1 Higashi Miyahama, Shichigahama-chō, Miyagi-gun, Miyagi-ken 985-8577
- Website: Official website

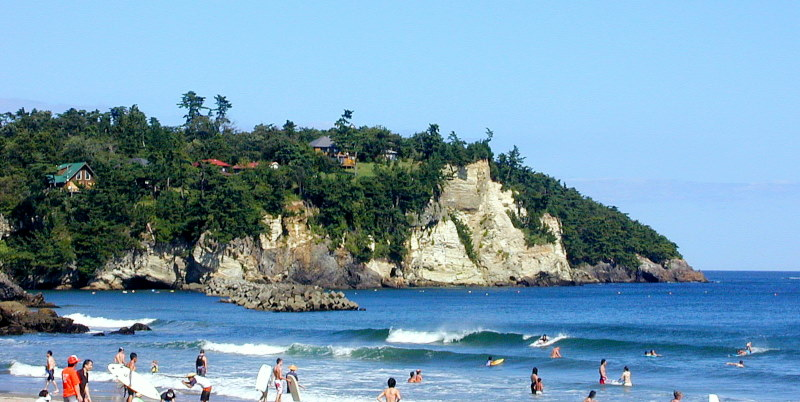
Takayama colony and Azukihama beach

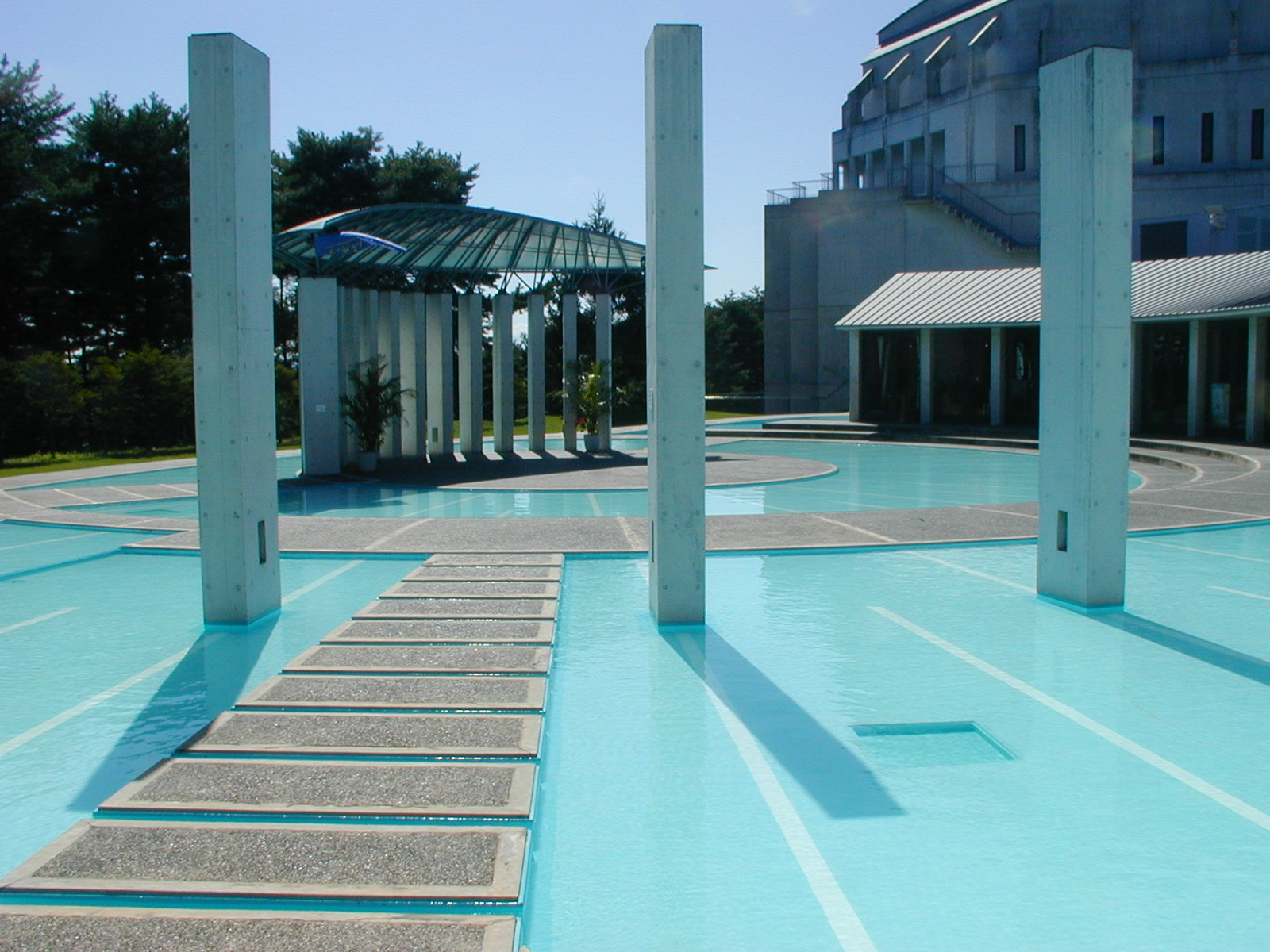
Amphitheatre of Kokusaimura

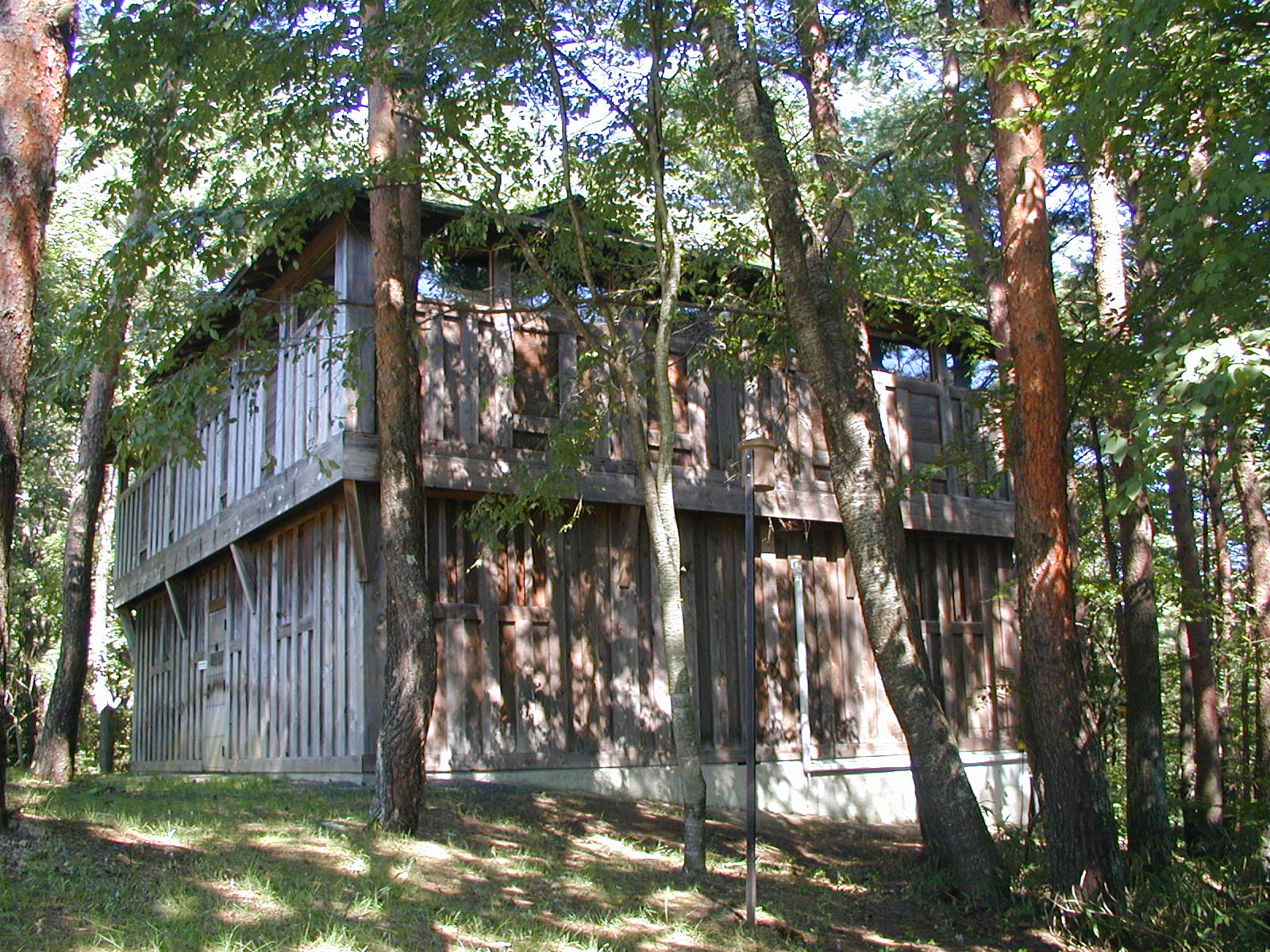
Plymouth House in Kokusaimura, modeling after the recreated First Parish Church in Plimoth Plantation

Shichigahama (七ヶ浜町, Shichigahama-machi) is a town located in Miyagi Prefecture, Japan. As of 1 June 2020, the town had an estimated population of 18,447, and a population density of 1,400 persons per km^{2} in 6,681 households. The total area of the town is 13.19 square kilometres (5.09 sq mi).

== Geography ==
The town is situated on a peninsula in the middle of Miyagi Prefecture between the cities of Tagajō in the west and Shiogama in the north and east, and about halfway between Sendai and Matsushima. Shichigahama is the smallest city, town or village by land area in the whole Tōhoku region. The climate is relatively mild compared to its surrounding area and temperatures do not greatly fluctuate.

The name Shichigahama literally means "seven beaches". The name comes from the seven seaside villages that originally combined to form the town. The seven beaches of Shichigahama are: Minatohama (湊浜), Matsugahama (松ヶ浜), Shobutahama (菖蒲田浜), Hanabuchihama (花渕浜), Yoshidahama (吉田浜), Yokasakihama (代ヶ崎浜) and Toguhama (東宮浜). In addition to the seven beaches, a number of neighborhoods located inland on the peninsula house a large portion of the population. These split into older neighborhoods: Yogai (要害), and Toyama (遠山), which sit close to the border with Tagajo and Shiogama, and newer neighborhoods, Shiomidai (汐見台) and Shiomidai Minami (汐見台南), which were built in the late 20th century.

=== Neighboring municipalities ===
Miyagi Prefecture

- Sendai
- Shiogama
- Tagajō

=== Climate ===
Shichigahama has a humid subtropical climate (Köppen climate classification Cfa) characterized by mild summers and cold winters. The average annual temperature in Shichigahama is 12.1 °C. The average annual rainfall is 1217 mm with September as the wettest month. The temperatures are highest on average in August, at around 24.6 °C, and lowest in January, at around 0.9 °C.

== Demographics ==
Per Japanese census data, the population of Shichigahama peaked around the year 2000 and has declined since.

Historical population
Year	Pop.	±%
1920	6,285	—
1930	7,441	+18.4%
1940	9,278	+24.7%
1950	11,618	+25.2%
1960	13,054	+12.4%
1970	14,204	+8.8%
1980	16,393	+15.4%
1990	19,523	+19.1%
2000	21,131	+8.2%
2010	20,416	−3.4%
2020	18,132	−11.2%

== History ==
The area of present-day Shichigahama was part of ancient Mutsu Province, and has been settled since at least the Jōmon period of Japanese pre-history. One of the largest shell mounds to be discovered in Japan is located at the Shichigahama Jōmon History Museum (Daigigakoikaizuka). With the establishment of Tagajō in the Nara period, Shichigahama was part of the central Yamato colonization area in the region. During this time, Shichigahama was recorded as sending a wealth of marine produce to the nearby capital. During the Sengoku period, the area was contested by various samurai clans before the area came under the control of the Date clan of Sendai Domain during the Edo period, under the Tokugawa shogunate.

Modern Shichigahama developed as the seven coastal settlements that now give the town its name and the village of Shichigahama was officially established in 1889 with the post-Meiji restoration establishment of the modern municipalities system.. The village was raised to town status on January 1, 1959. The population grew steadily, with the neighborhoods of Shiomidai and Shiomidai Minami being developed in the late 20th century, to a peak population of 21,131 people in 2000.

=== 2011 Tohoku earthquake and tsunami ===
On 11 March 2011 at 2:46 p.m. local time, the town was badly damaged by the tsunami caused by the 2011 Tohoku-Pacific Great earthquake. The tsunami was as tall as 10 m as it hit the town, destroying the majority of homes in Shobutahama and Hanabuchihama, as well as washing away or severely damaging many houses and buildings in the other coastal neighborhoods. The town estimates that over 1,000 houses were destroyed or damaged beyond use. The wave reached over 2 km inland, flooding the fields in front of Koyo Junior High School and Shiomidai and scattering the debris of the homes from Shobutahama. Approximately 95% of the town's rice fields were also flooded with seawater.

Ninety Shichigahama townspeople were confirmed to have died in the tsunami, 58 in Shichigahama and 32 in other locations, 6 townspeople were still missing and 7 non-townspeople were confirmed to have died in Shichigahama. Power, water and natural gas lines were damaged and many roads were impassable for days and weeks, except to rescue workers and self-defense forces. During this time, relief was delivered to the town by aid agencies. The conditions varied considerably between centres due to difficulties with logistics and post-disaster organization.

Over 4,000 people were initially evacuated to thirteen evacuation centres. People were slowly able to return to their homes, find alternative rental accommodation or relocate to the homes of family members, leaving 715 people in three shelters by April 27 and 229 people in two shelters (the Kokusaimura and Community Centre) by June 3. By Mid-June, everyone had been moved out of evacuation centres into alternative existing accommodation or town-provided temporary housing.

As the rescue activities were completed, relief and rebuilding efforts began. Temporary housing was built for 877 people at two sites: Shichigahama Sports Fields (151 homes, housing 569 people) and Shichigahama Junior High School Baseball Field (106 homes, housing 308 people). The temporary, pre-fabricated homes were initially intended for 2–3 years, however a large number remain in use in 2014 due to slow progress on rebuilding. The Japanese Self-Defence Force, who were instrumental in initial rescue and relief activities, continued to provide widespread support to the town. They cooked the food at the evacuation centres, provided temporary bathing facilities, and assisted in clearing debris. A volunteer centre was also established at the town community center, operated by volunteers and NGO's. The center coordinates the volunteer activities for hundreds of daily volunteers performing a range of tasks such as collecting and cleaning photos recovered from the debris, delivering donated items to the temporary homes, and clearing rubble and debris from sites of former homes.

Shichigahama's national and international relationships also provided support. The sister town of Plymouth, Massachusetts organized a number of fundraising events capped by a 3-hour telethon which raised over $85,000. Shichigahama's ocean-to-mountain sister town of Asahi, Yamagata-ken sent dozens of volunteers by bus every day to join the volunteer centre activities.

Shichigahama Junior High School was also severely damaged by the earthquake and was forced to close due to the structural damage. The students and staff were temporarily re-located to Koyo Junior High School, where the two schools shared facilities until pre-fabricated buildings could be sourced and installed at the Shichigahama Junior High School site. The former Shichigahama Junior High School building has been demolished (with the exception of the gym) and construction of a new building began in 2013.

== Government ==
Shichigahama has a mayor-council form of government with a directly elected mayor and a unicameral town council of 14 members. Shichigahama, as part of Miyagi District contributes one seat to the Miyagi Prefectural legislature. In terms of national politics, the town is part of Miyagi 5th district of the lower house of the Diet of Japan.

== Economy ==
The economy of Shichigahama is largely based on commercial fishing, and seasonal tourism.

Traditionally, Shichigahama was an ocean-driven economy with a large number of the population working in fishing, seaweed production, and also rice farming. This pattern has changed significantly in recent years with younger residents increasingly commuting to manufacturing and service jobs outside Shichigahama. A survey in 2000 indicated that working residents worked in the following industry sectors:

- Primary Industry (farming, fishing, resources) - 525 people
- Secondary Industry (manufacturing, production) - 3,392 people
- Tertiary Industry (Sales, Services) - 6,386 people

=== Seasonal tourism ===
The town is well known in the region for its beaches, and Shobutahama is a popular summer day-trip location for people from across Miyagi. During the summer season, a handful of "Umi no ie" (海の家) or "sea houses" are temporarily constructed on the beach, selling drinks and beach toys. Azukihama (小豆浜) in Hanabuchihama (花渕浜), is frequented almost year-round by the surfing community in Miyagi and northern Japan.

=== Farming and fishing ===
The commercial fishing industry is largely located in Hanabuchihama with a harbour, boats and related services located there. The majority of farmland in Shichigahama is family-owned. Family members work other main jobs in addition to growing rice, this leads a lot of the farming work to be performed by retirees and grandparents. Rice is produced primarily for family consumption with surplus production sold to local agricultural cooperatives. There is significant concern that this farming tradition will be lost in subsequent generations as younger family members choose not to farm or have moved to neighbouring cities and are not available for the daily farming activities. The tsunami is reported to have flooded up to 93% of Shichigahama's rice-fields with the salt-water rendering them unusable for a considerable period of time. The long-term implications of this for Shichigahama's farming are unclear.

=== Sendai Thermal Power Station ===
The Sendai Thermal Power Station is located in Yogasakihama, Shichigahama. The plant was built as a coal-fired power plant with four generating turbines but has since been converted to run on cleaner natural gas. Three turbines were decommissioned and the fourth was redesigned as a natural gas-powered combined-cycle generator. The building was also redesigned with the coal smoke stacks removed to reduce the visual profile on the scenic Matsushima coastline. The redesigned plant began operation on July 29, 2010. The plant is owned and operated by Tohoku Electric Power Company. Employees are often transferred from other company plants and relocate to the town either temporarily or semi-permanently.

=== Industry ===
A handful of factories are located in Toguhama, employing townspeople as well as workers from neighbouring Shiogama and Tagajo. The most notable are the Sony Supply Chain Solutions Centre, Yochan Foods Factory.

== Education ==
Shichigahama has two public middle schools and three public elementary schools operated by the town government. The town does not have a public high school.

- Middle Schools

- Kōyō Middle School (向洋中学校)
- Shichigahama Middle School (七ヶ浜中学校)

- Elementary Schools

- Ekiraku Elementary School (赤楽小学校)
- Matsugahama Elementary School (松ヶ浜小学校)
- Shiomi Elementary School (汐見小学校)

Shichigahama Middle School is nicknamed "Nana-chu" and Kōyō Middle School is nicknamed "Koyo-chu". Students are assigned to a school based on the location of their family home. Therefore, Shiomi Elementary feeds students into Koyo-chu and Ekiraku Elementary feeds into Nana-chu, Matsugahama Elementary students are split between the two middle schools.

== Transportation ==
Shichigahama is not served by any railway stations or national highways. The nearest rail stations are Tagajō Station, Geba Station, and Hon-Shiogama Station on the JR East Senseki Line. A local town bus called the Guririnko (ぐりりんこ) also runs throughout Shichigahama and goes to and from both Tagajō and Hon-Shiogama Station. Several other bus lines have stops within the town, particularly around the Shiomidai and Shiomidai Minami neighborhoods, that also offer service to nearby railway stations.

== Local attractions ==
=== Sports and leisure ===
- Aquarena – a modern leisure centre located in the middle of Shichigahama. The Aquarena contains a main gym hall with arena seating, an indoor running track around the gym, weight and cardio exercise equipment, a hydro-therapy centre (a pool for walking) and a restaurant. Below the Aquarena sits Shichigahama Soccer Stadium (七ヶ浜サッカースタジアム) with a well-maintained grass pitch and a stand for 2,300 spectators. The stadium hosts a small number of amateur club teams, such as Sony Sendai, and school tournaments. Next to the soccer stadium are the town playing fields (七ヶ浜スポーツ広場) which have a gravel soccer pitch, baseball field and hard-court tennis courts.
- International Village (国際村, Kokusaimura) – a public facility that holds both locally and internationally themed events and shows. This facility gets its name from the original name of the Takayama resort. Like many other towns in Japan, Shichigahama employs several international Assistant Language Teachers to work in the town's three elementary schools and two junior high schools assisting in English lessons. More unusually for its size, the town also employs two Coordinators for International Relations (CIR) from the JET Programme to work at the International Village coordinating events and supporting the sister city relationship.
- Takayama colony – a summer resort for foreign missionaries that was established in 1889 when the town leased the land to the colony. The colony is located on a fenced hill overlooking Azukihama and Shobutahama beaches and has a foreigners' cemetery.

== International relations ==
- (United States) Plymouth, Massachusetts, USA, since October 3, 1990.
