= Tōhoku History Museum =

Archaeological museum in Tagajō, Japan

- 東北歴史博物館
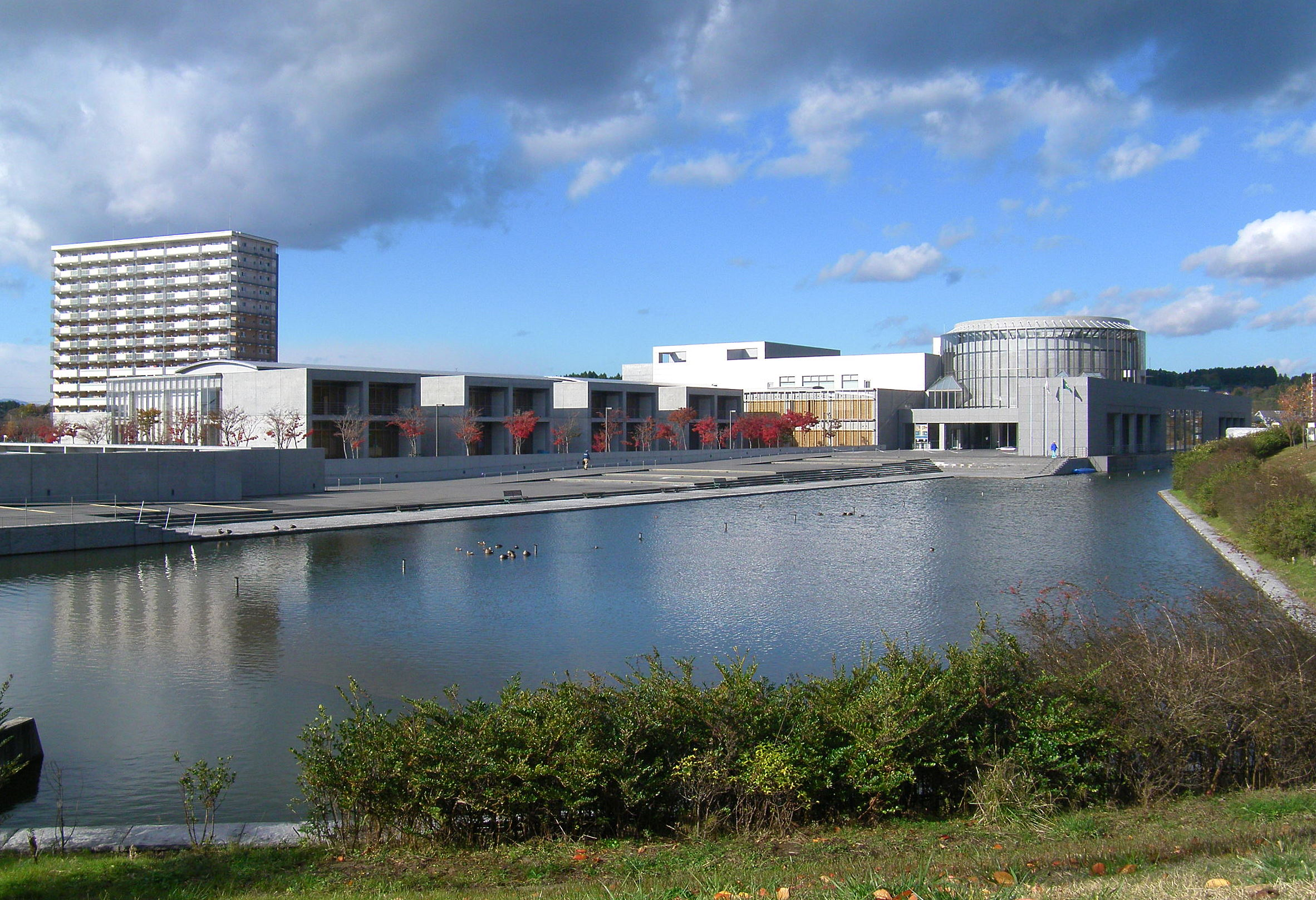
- Tōhoku History Museum
- Established: 9 October 1999
- Location: 1-21-1 Takasaki, Tagajō-shi, Miyagi-ken, Japan
- Coordinates: 38°18′00″N 140°59′40″E
- Website: Official website

The Tōhoku History Museum (東北歴史博物館, Tōhoku Rekishi Hakubutsukan) is a museum in Tagajō, Miyagi Prefecture, Japan. It houses finds from excavations at the site of Tagajō as well as from other archaeological sites in the Tōhoku region of northern Japan.

These include a Jōmon period jade axe excavated in Kizukuri, Aomori Prefecture, and designated an Important Cultural Property; and another Jōmon jade, excavated in Niisato, Iwate Prefecture, also designated an Important Cultural Property.

== See also ==
- Site of Tagajō
- Japanese museums
