= Shiogama Station =

Railway station in Shiogama, Miyagi Prefecture, Japan

Shiogama Station 塩釜駅
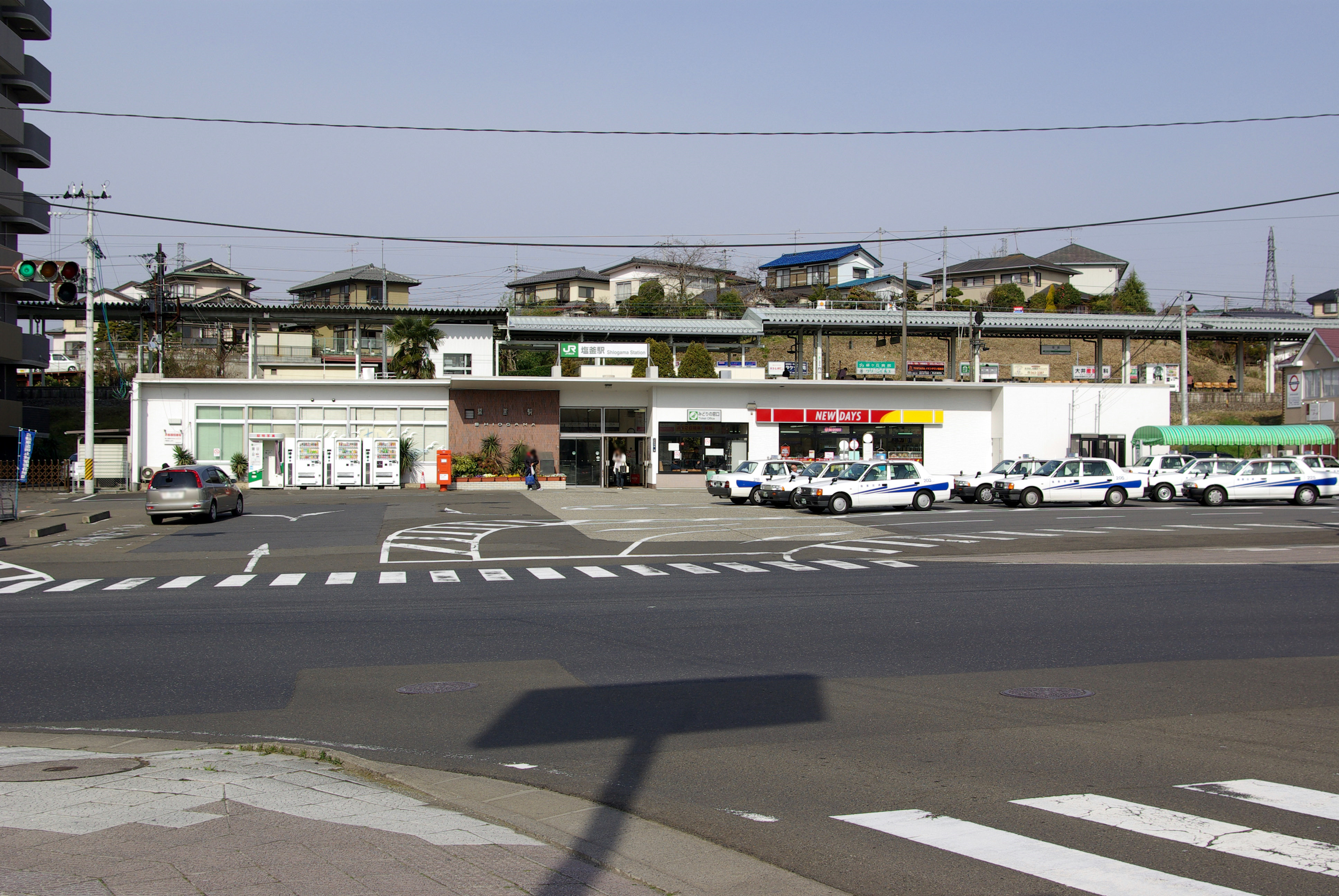
- Shiogama Station, April 2009

General information
- Location: 5-1 Higashi-Tamagawa-cho, Shiogama-shi, Miyagi-ken 985-0042; Japan
- Coordinates: 38.3092°N 141.0092°E
- Operator: JR East
- Lines: ■ Tōhoku Main Line; ■ Senseki-Tōhoku Line
- Distance: 365.2 km from Tokyo
- Platforms: 1 island platform
- Tracks: 2

Other information
- Status: Staffed ("Midori no Madoguchi")
- Website: Official website

History
- Opened: July 9, 1956

Passengers
- FY2016: 2931 daily

Services
Preceding station	JR East	Following station
Kokufu-Tagajō towards Kuroiso	Tōhoku Main Line Local	Matsushima towards Morioka
Sendai Terminus	Senseki-Tōhoku Line Special Rapid	Takagimachi towards Ishinomaki
Sendai Terminus	Senseki-Tōhoku Line Rapid	Takagimachi towards Onagawa
Kokufu-Tagajō towards Sendai	Senseki-Tōhoku Line Rapid	Takagimachi towards Ishinomaki
Location
- Location within Japan

Shiogama Station (塩釜駅, Shiogama-eki) is a railway station on the Tōhoku Main Line in the city of Shiogama, Miyagi, Japan, operated by East Japan Railway Company (JR East).

== Lines ==
Shiogama Station is served by the Tōhoku Main Line, and lies 365.2 km from the official starting point of the line at Tokyo Station. Trains of the Senseki-Tōhoku Line also stop at Shiogama Station, which is 14.3 kilometers from the official starting point of the line at Sendai Station.

== Station layout ==
Shiogama Station has one elevated island platform serving two tracks, with the station building situated underneath. The station has a "Midori no Madoguchi" staffed ticket office.

=== Platforms ===
1	■ Tōhoku Main Line	for Sendai, Shiroishi, and Fukushima
	■ Senseki-Tōhoku Line	for Sendai, Shiroishi
2	■ Tōhoku Main Line	for Matsushima and Kogota
	■ Senseki-Tōhoku Line	for Ishinomaki

== History ==
Shiogama Station opened on July 9, 1956. The station was absorbed into the JR East network upon the privatization of the Japanese National Railways (JNR) on April 1, 1987.

== Passenger statistics ==
In fiscal 2016, the station was used by an average of 2,931 passengers daily (boarding passengers only).

== Surrounding area ==
- Shiogama City Tamagawa Elementary School
- East Shiogama Tamagawa Post Office
- Shiogama City Hospital
- Shiogama Shrine
- National Route 45

== See also ==
- List of railway stations in Japan
