= Toyoma Education Museum =

Museum in Miyagi Prefecture, Japan

- 旧登米高等尋常小学校校舎
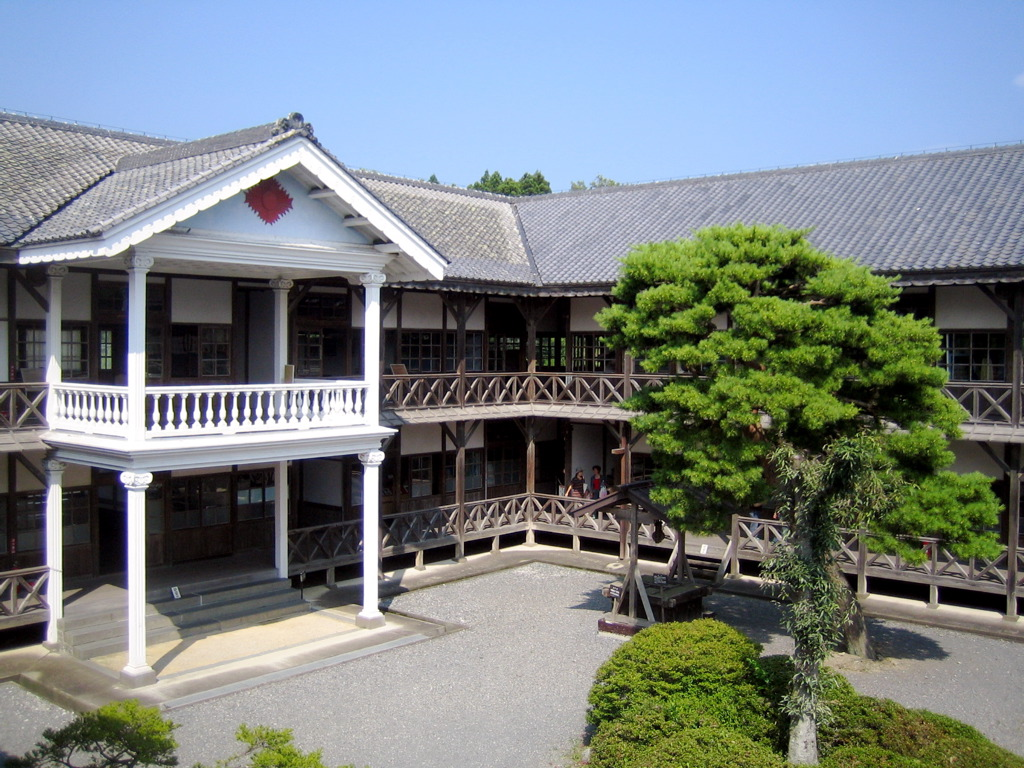
- The Junior School building of 1888 is an Important Cultural Property
- Interactive map of the Toyoma Education Museum area

General information
- Location: Teraike Sakura koji 6, Tome-cho, Tome, Miyagi Prefecture, Japan
- Coordinates: 38°39′19″N 141°16′47″E
- Opened: 1888
- Owner: Iwate Prefecture

Technical details
- Floor count: 2 above ground
- Floor area: 841.7 m2

Design and construction
- Architect: Kisaburo Yamazoe

Website
- www.pref.miyagi.jp/bunkazai/siteibunkazai/miyagi-no-bunkazai/01kenzoubutu/kuni/16toyoma.htm

Toyoma Education Museum exhibits the history of education in Japan since the Meiji period. It is housed in the former Tome Elementary School Building (旧登米高等尋常小学校校舎) of 1888 in the city of Tome, Miyagi Prefecture. The U-shaped two-storey building around a courtyard, lined with balconies and with half-hexagons at the end of each wing, was designed by Kisaburo Yamazoe. It is representative of the western-inspired architecture of the Meiji period and in 1981 was designated an Important Cultural Property.

== See also ==
- Education in the Empire of Japan
- Imperial Rescript on Education
- Kaichi School Museum
- Meiji Mura
