= Kaichi School =

School in Matsumoto, Nagano Prefecture, Japan

Coordinates: 36°14′36″N 137°58′06″E

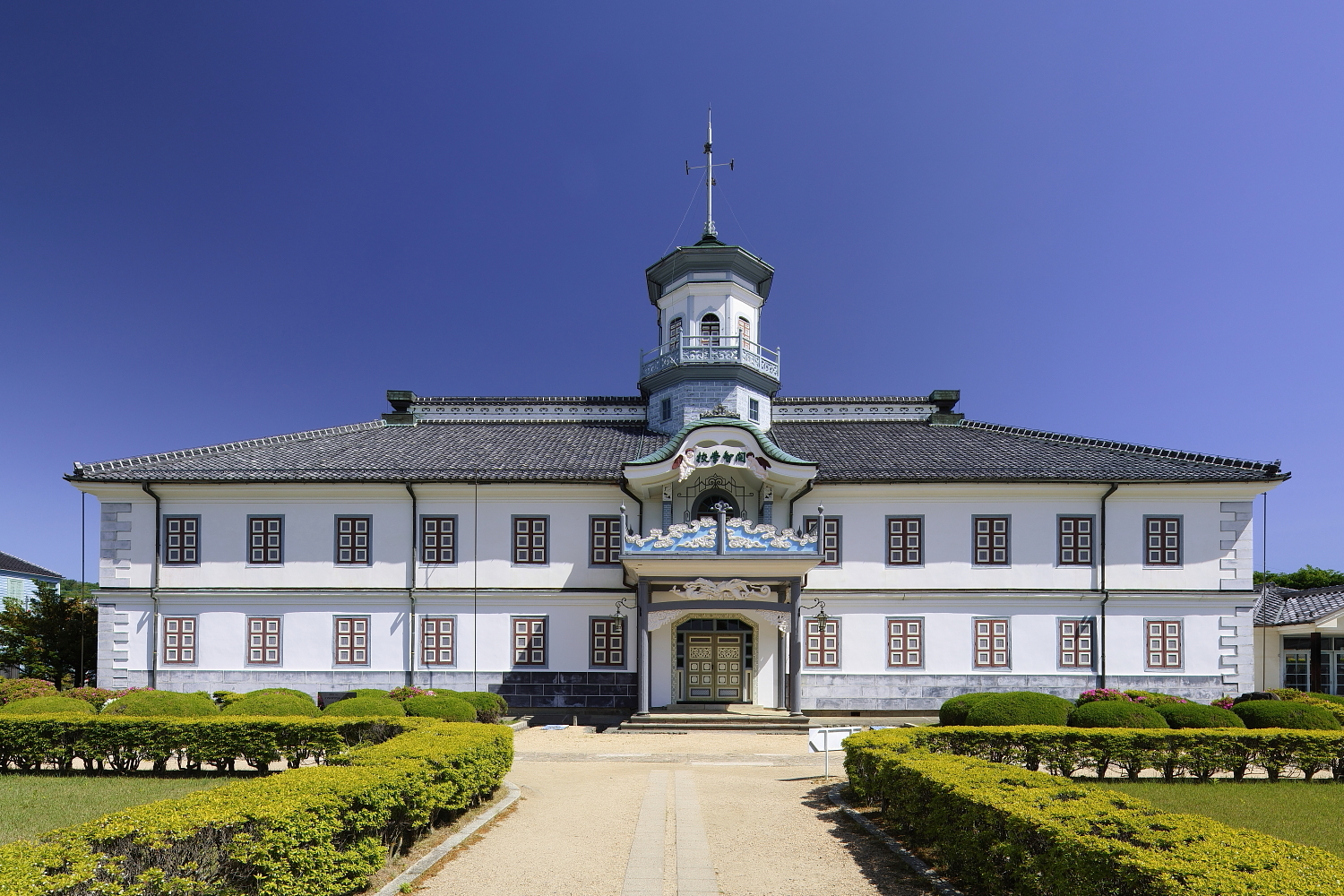
The former Kaichi School in Matsumoto, one of the first schools in Japan

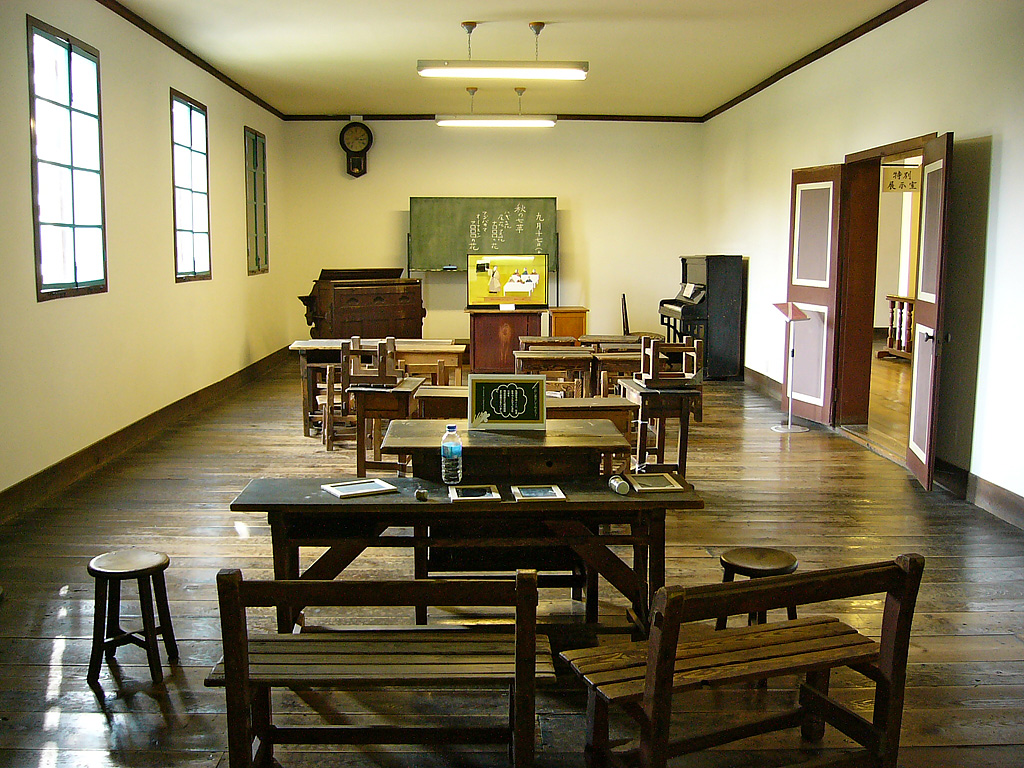
A classroom inside the school

The Kaichi School (旧開智学校, kyūkaichi-gakkō) in Matsumoto, Nagano Prefecture was one of the first schools in Japan. It opened in a temporary building in May 1873, the year after the first major education reforms were introduced by the new Ministry of Education. The school moved to new premises in April 1876. This western-style building, fused with Japanese elements, was designated an Important Cultural Property in 1961. Relocated two years later during work on the nearby Metoba River, in 1965 the old school building was turned into an education museum.

In 2019 the school was designated as National Treasure of Japan.

== See also ==
- Education in the Empire of Japan
- Toyoma Education Museum
- Meiji period
- Meiji Mura
- Japanese-Western Eclectic Architecture
