= National Treasure (Japan) =

Most valued tangible cultural properties

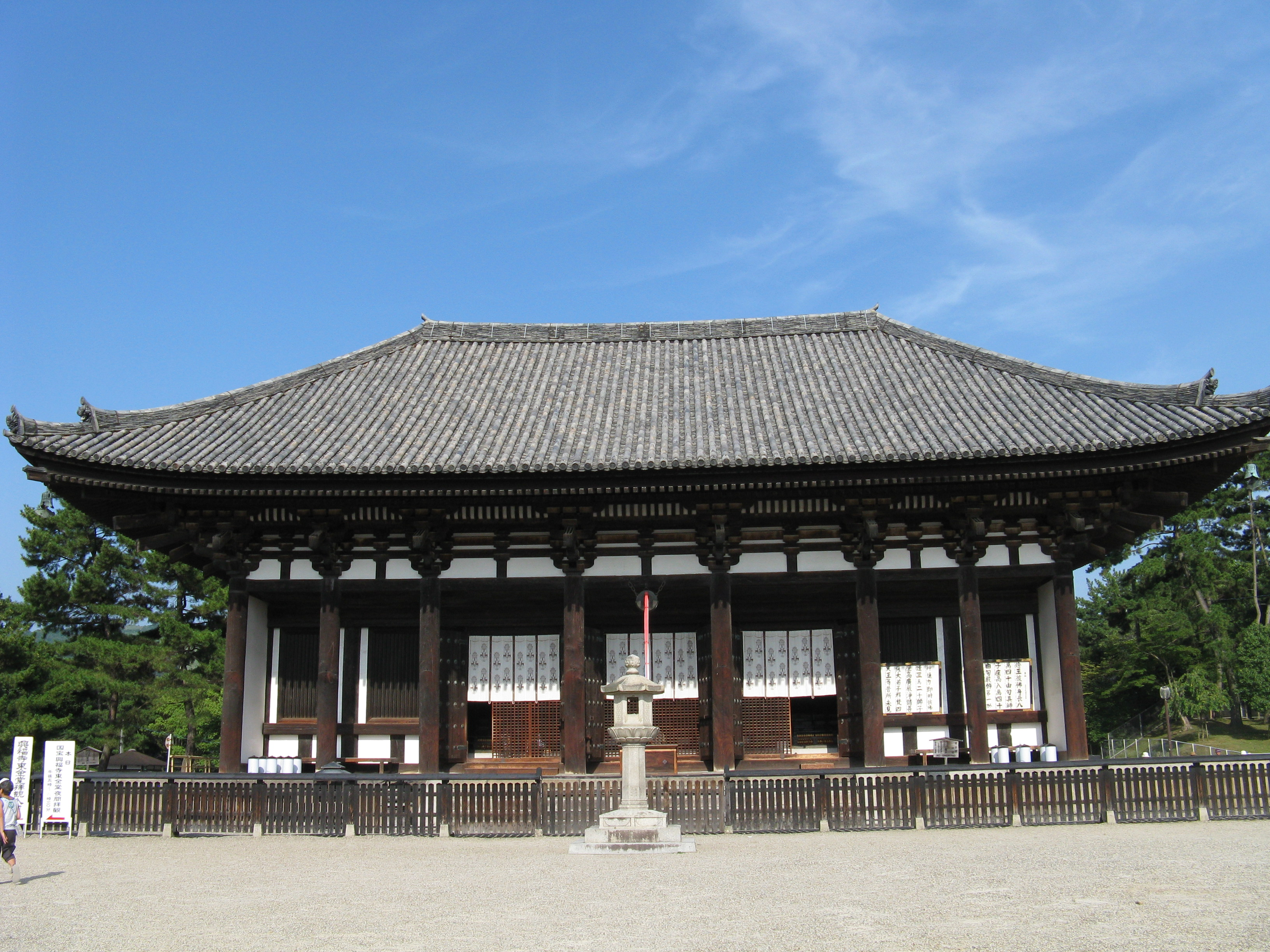

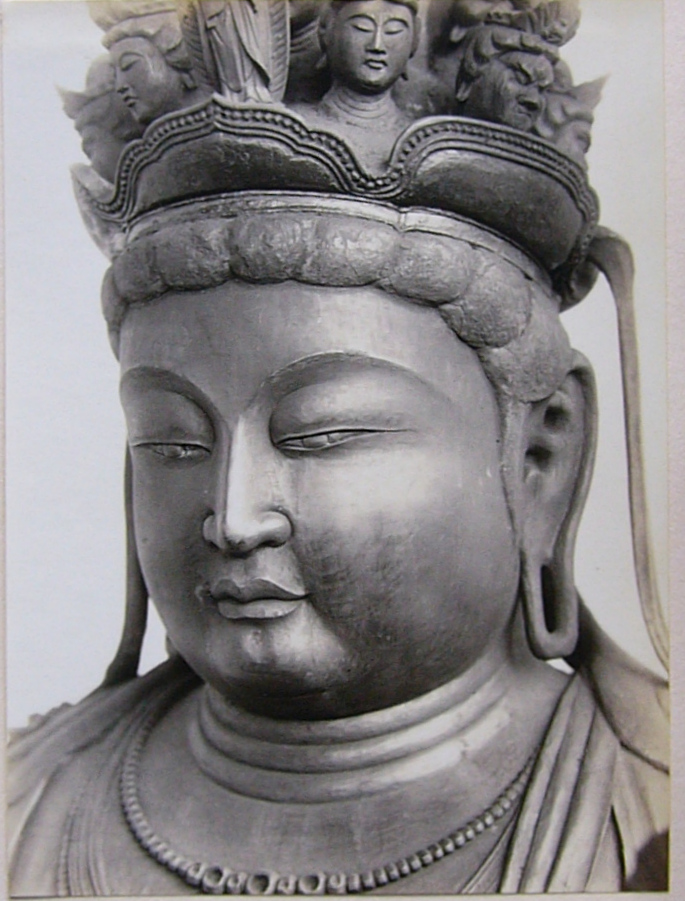

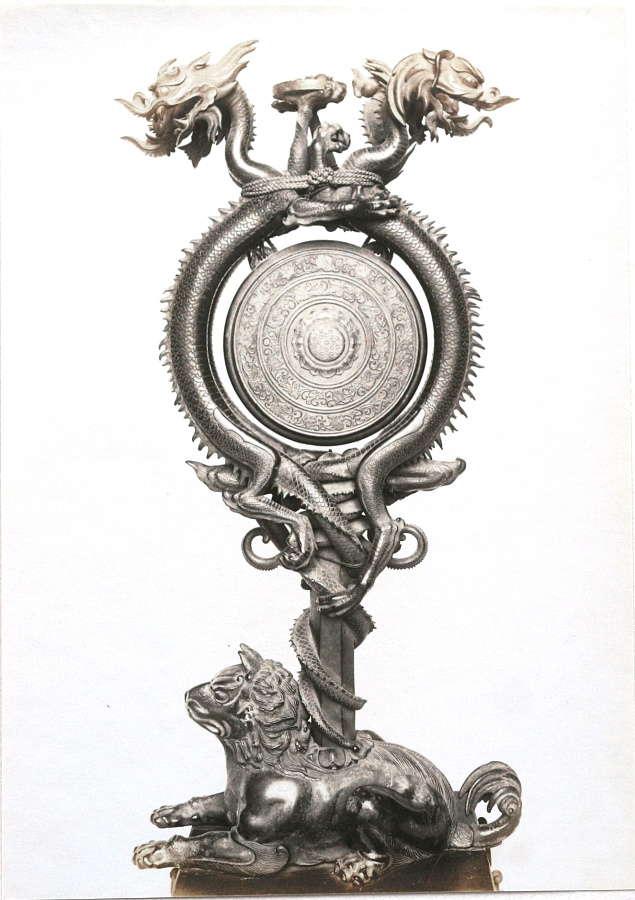

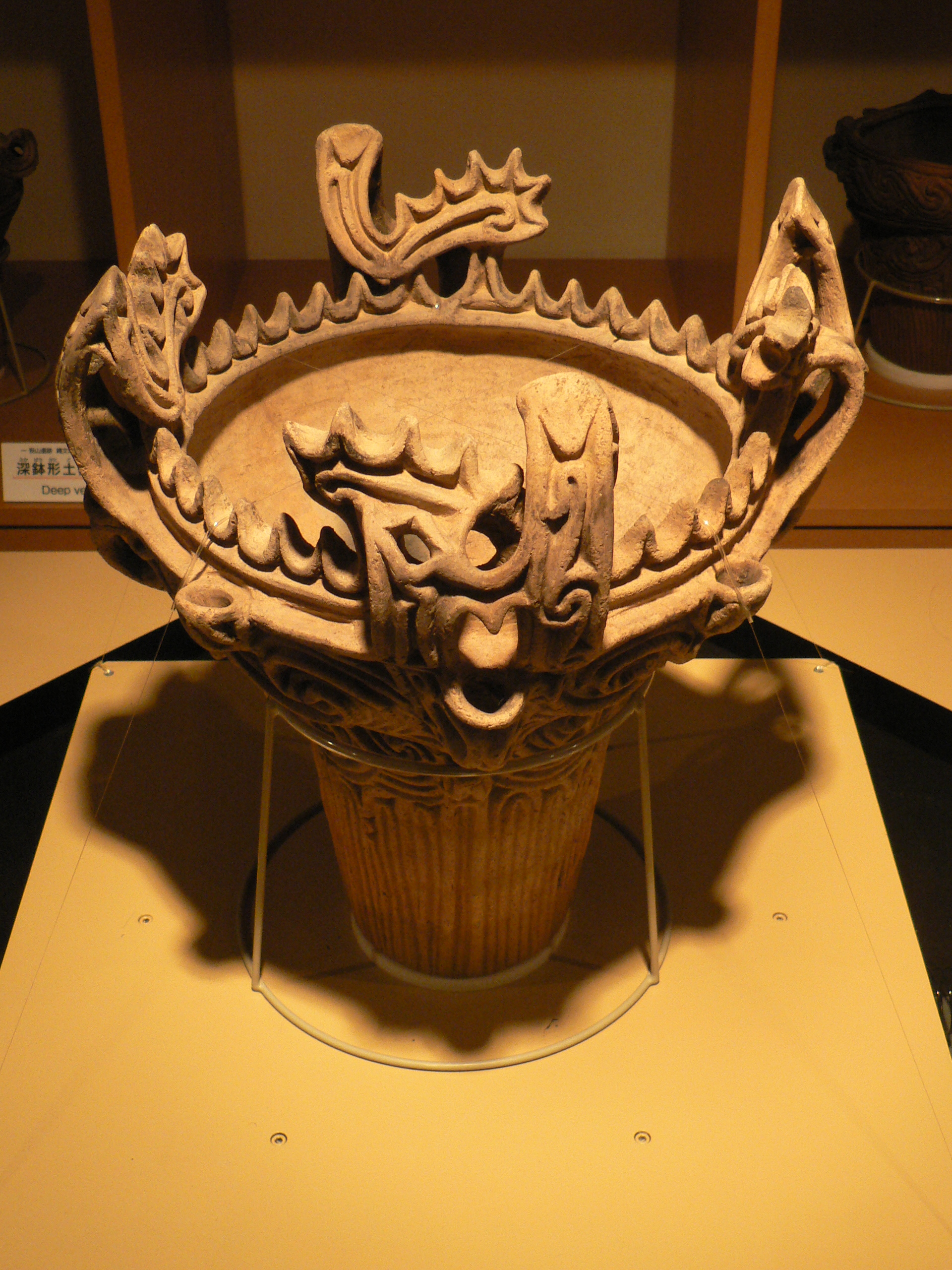

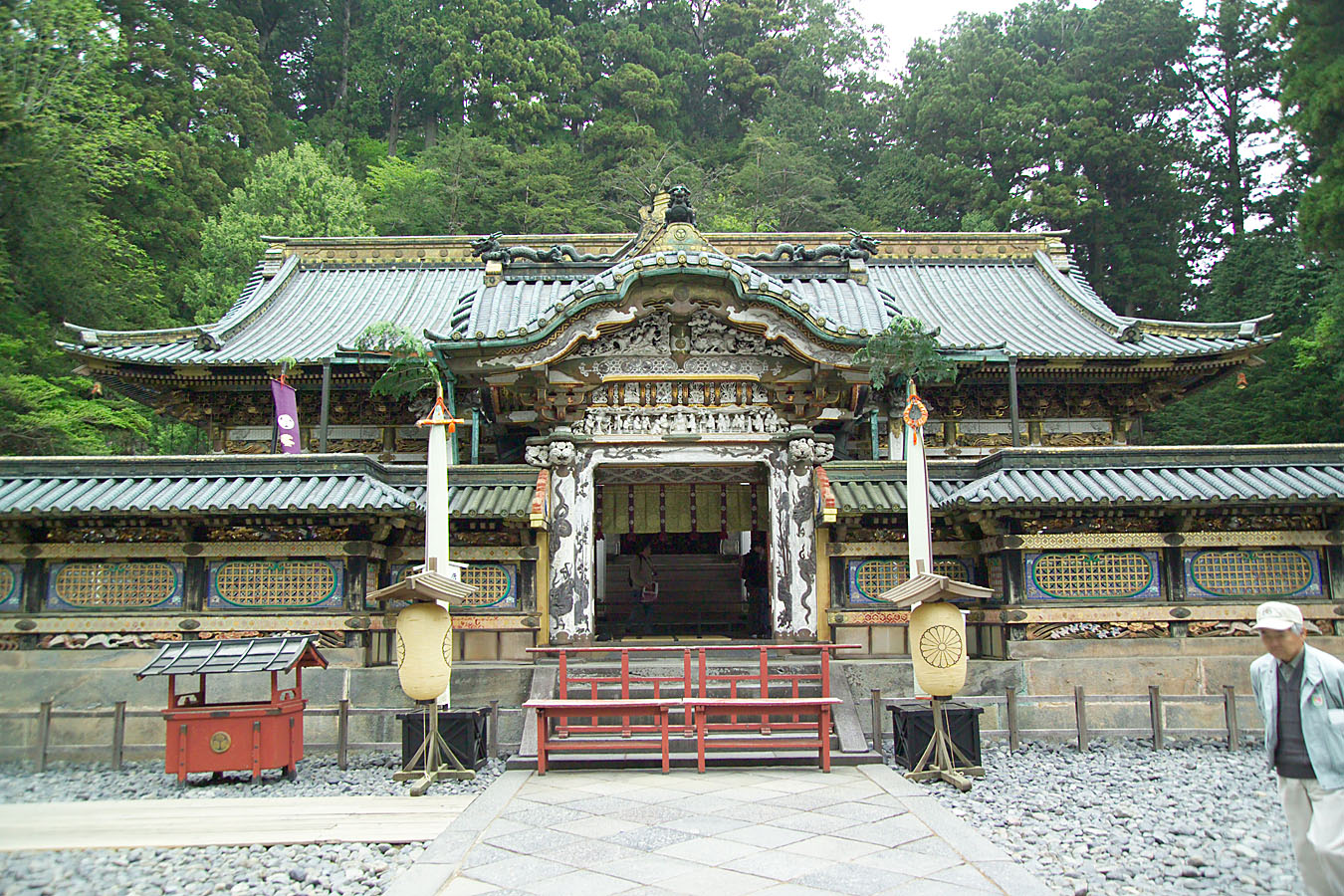

Some of the national treasures of Japan

In Japan, national treasures (国宝, kokuhō) are tangible cultural properties designated by Japanese law as “having exceptionally high value.” It applies to buildings, artwork, and crafts, selected from Important tangible cultural properties by the Agency for Cultural Affairs (a special body of the Ministry of Education, Culture, Sports, Science and Technology). A tangible cultural property is considered to be of historic or artistic value, classified either as buildings and structures or as fine arts and crafts. Each national treasure must demonstrate outstanding workmanship, high value for world cultural history, or exceptional value for scholarship.

Approximately 20 percent of the national treasures are structures, such as castles, Buddhist temples, Shinto shrines, or residences. The remaining 80 percent are works of art, which include: paintings, scrolls, sutras, calligraphy, sculptures (in wood, bronze, lacquer, or stone), and craft pieces such as pottery, lacquerware, metalwork, swords, textiles, and archaeological artifacts. These items are from ancient to early modern Japan periods before the Meiji period, including pieces of the world's oldest pottery from the Jōmon period and 19th-century documents and writings. The designation of the Akasaka Palace in 2009, the Tomioka Silk Mill in 2014, and the Kaichi School added three modern, post-Meiji Restoration national treasures.

Japan has a comprehensive network of legislation for preserving and classifying its cultural patrimony. The regard for physical and intangible properties is typical of Japanese preservation and restoration practices. Methods of protecting designated national treasures include restrictions on alterations, transfers, and exports, as well as financial support in the form of grants and tax reductions. The Agency for Cultural Affairs provides owners with advice on restoration, administration, and public display of the properties. These efforts are supplemented by laws that protect the built environment of designated structures, and the necessary techniques for the restoration of works.

Kansai, home to Japan's capital from ancient times to the 19th century, has the most national treasures, with Kyoto alone accounting for one-fifth of the total. Fine arts and crafts properties are usually privately owned or housed in museums—including national museums in Tokyo, Kyoto, and Nara—as well as public prefectural, city and private museums. Religious items are often housed in temples and shrines, or in an adjacent museum or treasure house.

== History ==
=== Background and early protection efforts ===
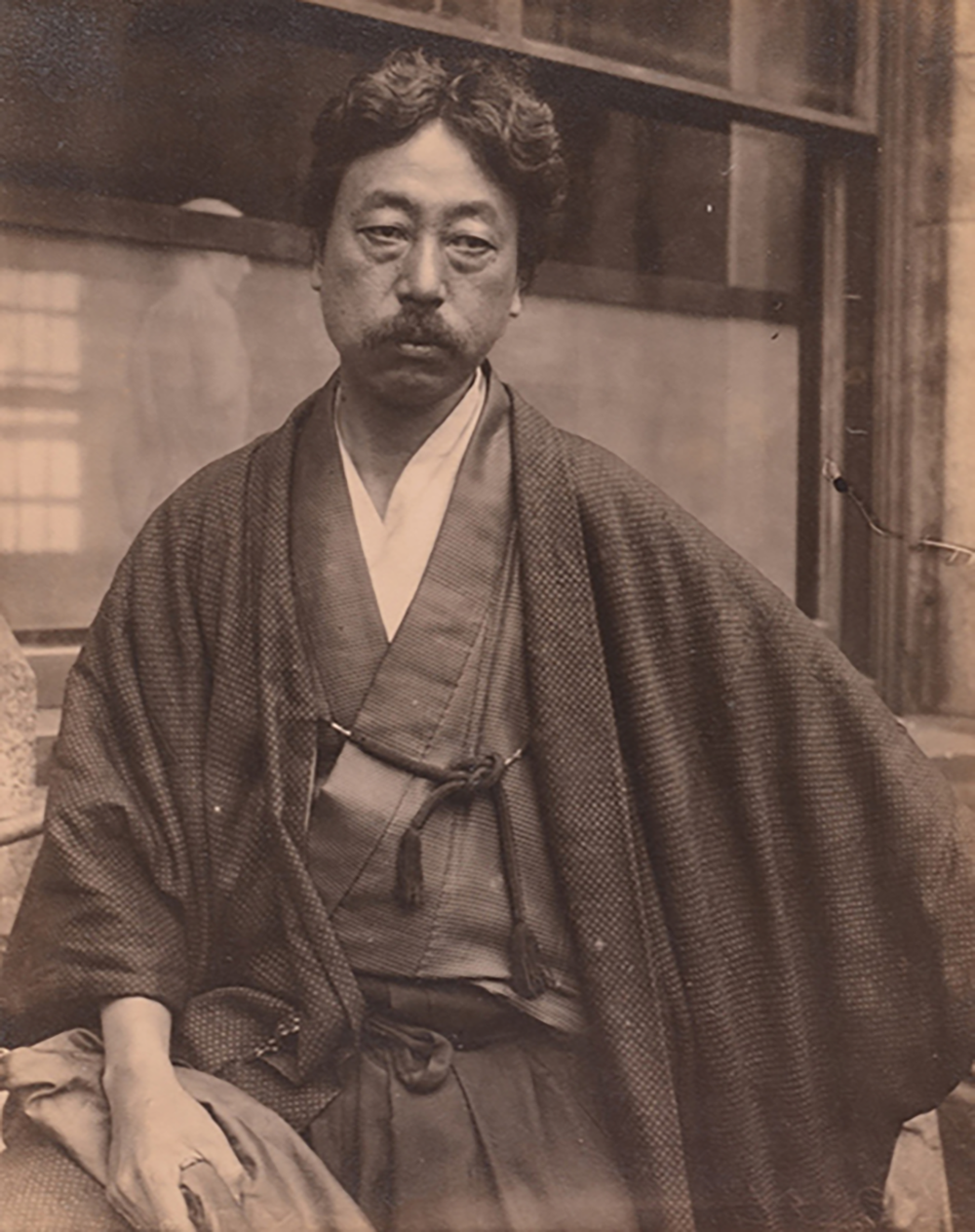
Okakura Kakuzō

Japanese cultural properties were originally in the ownership of Buddhist temples, Shinto shrines, and aristocratic or samurai families. Feudal Japan ended abruptly in 1867–1868 when the Tokugawa shogunate was replaced by the Meiji Restoration. During the ensuing haibutsu kishaku ("abolish Buddhism and destroy Shākyamuni"), triggered by the official policy of separation of Shinto and Buddhism and anti-Buddhist movements propagating the return to Shinto, Buddhist buildings and artwork were destroyed. In 1871, the government confiscated temple lands, considered symbolic of the ruling elite. Properties belonging to the feudal lords were expropriated, historic castles and residences were destroyed, and an estimated 18,000 temples were closed. During the same period, Japanese cultural heritage was impacted by the rise of industrialization and Westernization. As a result, Buddhist and Shinto institutions became impoverished. Temples decayed, and valuable objects were exported.

In 1871, the Daijō-kan issued a decree to protect Japanese antiquities called the Plan for the Preservation of Ancient Artifacts (古器旧物保存方, koki kyūbutsu hozonkata). Based on recommendations from universities, the decree ordered prefectures, temples, and shrines to compile lists of important buildings and art. However, these efforts proved to be ineffective in the face of rapid Western influence. In 1880, the government allotted funds for the preservation of ancient shrines and temples. (Note: Under the policy of State Shinto, shrines had been receiving funds since 1874.) By 1894, 539 shrines and temples, such as the five-storied pagoda of Daigo-ji, the kon-dō of Tōshōdai-ji, and the hon-dō of Kiyomizu-dera, had received government-funded subsidies to conduct repairs and reconstruction during this period. A survey, conducted in association with Okakura Kakuzō and Ernest Fenollosa between 1888 and 1897, was designed to evaluate and catalogue 210,000 objects of artistic or historic merit. The end of the 19th century was a period of political change in Japan, as cultural values moved from the enthusiastic adoption of Western ideas to a newfound interest in Japanese heritage. Japanese architectural history began to appear in curricula, and the first books on architectural history were published, stimulated by the newly compiled inventories of buildings and art.

=== Ancient temples and Shrines Preservation Law ===
First of the scrolls of Frolicking Animals and Humans owned by Kōzan-ji

On June 5, 1897, the Ancient Temples and Shrines Preservation Law (古社寺保存法, koshaji hozonhō) (law number 49) was enacted; it was the first systematic law for the preservation of Japanese historic art and architecture. Formulated under the guidance of architectural historian and architect Itō Chūta, the law established (in 20 articles) government funding for the preservation of buildings and the restoration of artworks. The law applied to architecture and pieces of art relating to an architectural structure, with the proviso that historic uniqueness and exceptional quality were to be established (article 2). Applications for financial support were to be made to the Ministry of Internal Affairs (article 1), and the responsibility for restoration or preservation lay in the hands of local officials (article 3). Restoration works were financed directly from the national coffers (article 3).

A second law was passed on December 15, 1897, that provided supplementary provisions to designate works of art in the possession of temples or shrines as "national treasures" (国宝, kokuhō). The new law also provided for pieces of religious architecture to be designated as a "Specially Protected Building" (特別保護建造物, tokubetsu hogo kenzōbutsu). While the main criteria were "artistic superiority" and "value as historical evidence and wealth of historical associations," the age of the piece was an additional factor. Designated artworks could be from any of the following categories: paintings, sculptures, calligraphy, books, and handicrafts, but swords were added later. The law had limited protection to items held at religious institutions, while articles in private ownership remained unprotected. Funds designated for the restoration of works of art and structures were increased from 20,000 yen to 150,000 yen, and fines were set for the destruction of cultural properties. Owners were required to register designated objects with newly created museums, which were granted the first option of purchase in case of sale. Initially, 44 temple and shrine buildings and 155 relics were designated under the new law, including the kon-dō at Hōryū-ji.

The laws of 1897 are the foundation for today's preservation law. When they were enacted, only England, France, Greece, and four other European nations had similar legislation. As a result of the new laws, Tōdai-ji's Daibutsuden was restored beginning in 1906 and finishing in 1913. In 1914, the administration of cultural properties was transferred from the Ministry of Internal Affairs to the Ministry of Education (today MEXT).

=== Extension of the protection ===
At the beginning of the 20th century, modernisation transformed the Japanese landscape and posed a threat to historic and natural monuments. Societies of prominent men, such as the Imperial Ancient Sites Survey Society or the Society for the Investigation and Preservation of Historic Sites and Aged Trees, lobbied and achieved a resolution in the House of Peers for conservation measures. Eventually, these efforts resulted in the 1919 Historical Sites, Places of Scenic Beauty, and Natural Monuments Preservation Law (史蹟名勝天然紀念物保存法, shiseki meishō enrenkinenbutsu hozonhō), protecting and cataloguing such properties in the same manner as temples, shrines, and pieces of art.

By 1929, about 1,100 properties had been designated under the 1897 Ancient Shrines and Temples Preservation Law. Most were religious buildings dating from the 7th to the early 17th century. Approximately 500 buildings were extensively restored, with 90 percent of the funding provided by the national budget. Restorations during the Meiji period often employed new materials and techniques.

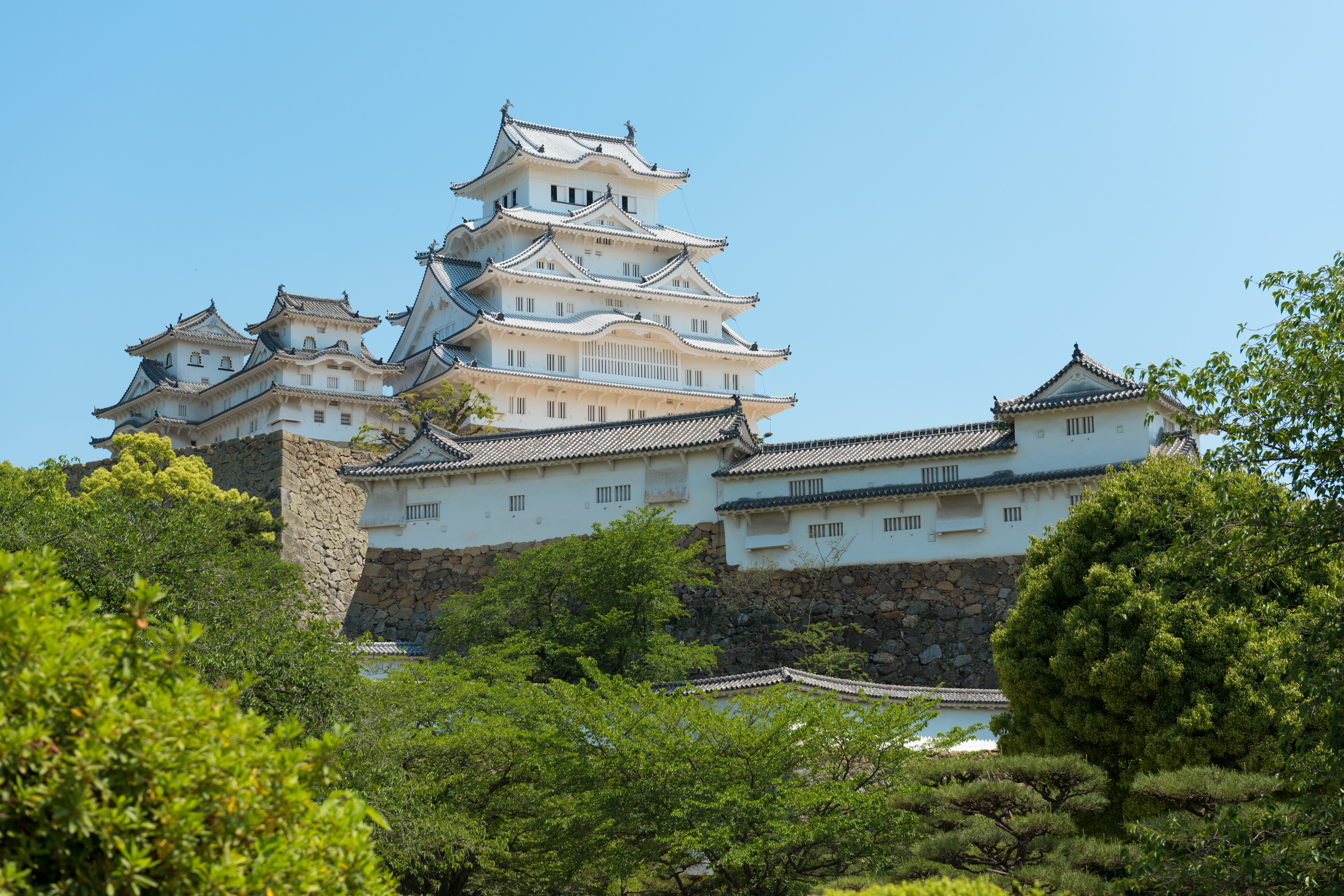
In 1931, Himeji Castle became a national treasure under the National Treasures Preservation Law of 1929.

In 1929, the National Treasures Preservation Law (国宝保存法, kokuhō hozonhō) was passed and went into effect on July 1st of that year. The new laws replaced the 1897 laws and extended protection for national treasures held by institutions, both public and private, as well as individuals, in an effort to prevent the export or removal of cultural properties. The focus of protection was not only for old religious buildings but also for castles, teahouses, residences, and more recently built religious buildings. Many of these structures had been transferred from feudal to private ownership following the Meiji restoration. Some of the first residential buildings to be designated national treasures were the Yoshimura residence in Osaka (1937) and the Ogawa residence in Kyoto (1944). The designation "national treasure" was applied to objects of art and to historical buildings. The new law required permits to be obtained for future alterations of designated properties.

The restoration of Tōdai-ji's Nandaimon gate in 1930 saw improved standards for preservation. An architect supervised the reconstruction works on-site. Extensive restoration reports became the norm, including plans, results of surveys, historical sources, and documentation of the work done. During the 1930s, about 70–75 percent of restoration costs came from the national budget, which increased even during the war.

In the early 1930s, Japan suffered from the Great Depression. In an effort to prevent art objects not yet designated national treasures from being exported because of the economic crisis, the Law Regarding the Preservation of Important Works of Fine Arts (重要美術品等ノ保存ニ関スル 法律, jūyō bijutsuhin tōno hozon ni kan suru hōritsu) was passed on April 1, 1933. It provided a simplified designation procedure with temporary protections, including protections against exportation. About 8,000 objects were protected under the law, including temples, shrines, and residential buildings. By 1939, nine categories of properties consisting of 8,282 items (paintings, sculptures, architecture, documents, books, calligraphy, swords, crafts, and archaeological resources) had been designated as national treasures and were forbidden to be exported.

During World War II, many of the designated buildings were camouflaged, and water tanks and fire walls were installed for protection. Nonetheless, 206 designated buildings, including Hiroshima Castle, were destroyed from May to August 1945. The ninth-century Buddhist text Tōdaiji Fujumonkō, designated a national treasure in 1938, was destroyed by a fire in 1945 as a result of the war.

=== Law for the Protection of Cultural Properties ===
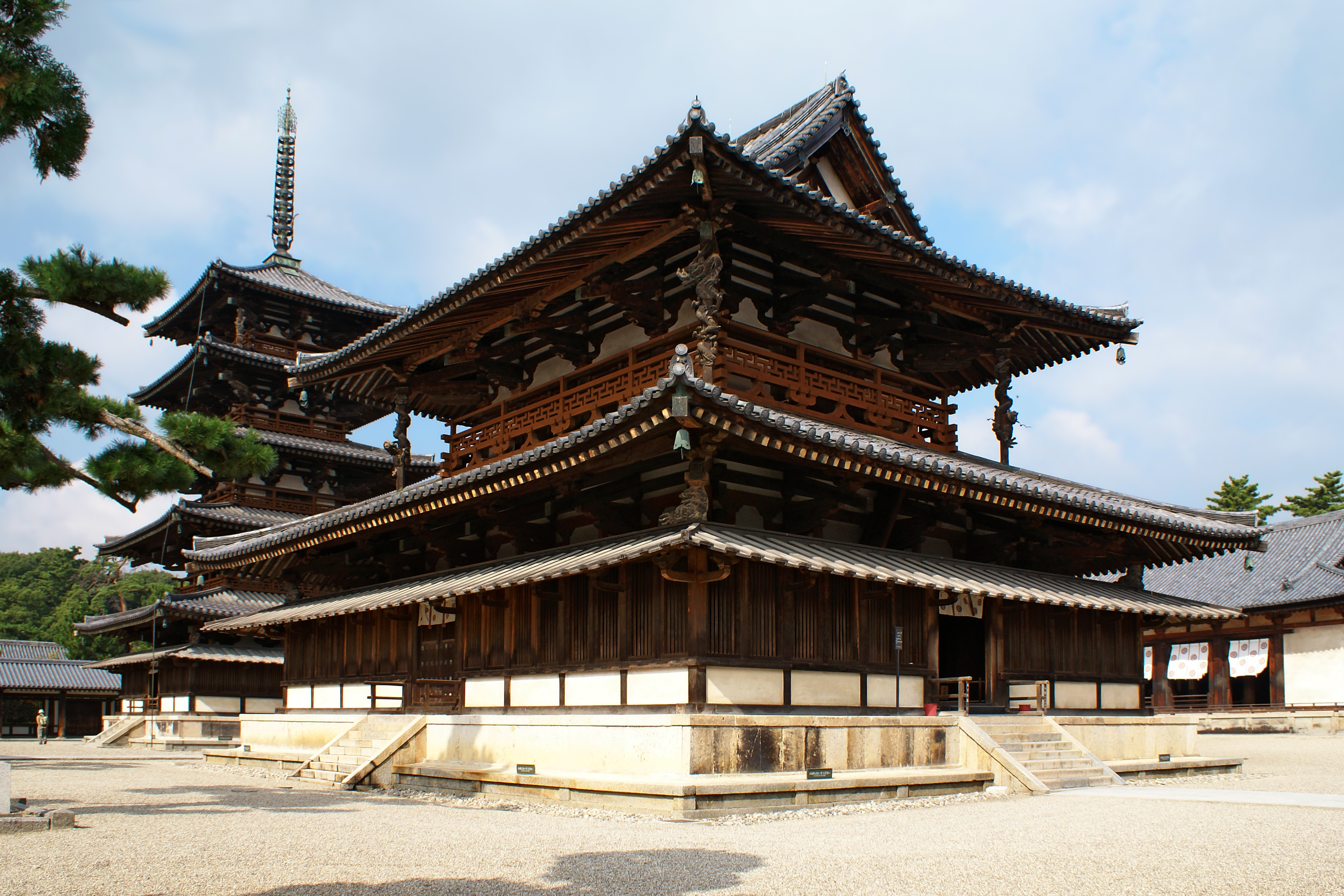
Kon-dō and five-storied pagoda at Hōryū-ji, two of the world's oldest wooden structures, dating to around 700

When the kon-dō of Hōryū-ji, one of the oldest surviving wooden structures in the world and the first to be protected under the "Ancient Temples and Shrines Preservation Law", caught fire on January 26, 1949, its valuable seventh-century wall paintings were severely damaged. The incident accelerated the reorganization of Japan's cultural property protection and gave rise to the Law for the Protection of Cultural Properties (文化財保護法, bunkazai hogohō), which was drafted on May 30, 1950, and went into effect on August 29 of that year.

The new law combined the laws of 1919, 1929, and 1933. The scope of the previous protection laws was expanded to cover "intangible cultural properties" such as performing and applied arts, "folk cultural properties," and "buried cultural properties." Before the enactment of this law, only intangible cultural properties of especially high value at risk of extinction had been protected. Even with international standards, a broad spectrum of properties was covered by the 1950 law. The law was the basis for the establishment of the Committee for the Protection of Cultural Properties, a precursor of today's Agency for Cultural Affairs. It allowed the selection of the most important cultural properties; set restrictions on the alteration, repair, and export of cultural properties; and provided measures for the preservation and utilization of such properties.

The regulations implementing the law specified three broad categories of properties: tangible/intangible cultural properties and "historic sites, places of scenic beauty, and natural monuments." Tangible cultural properties were defined as objects of "high artistic or historic value" or archaeological materials (or other historic material) of "high scholarly value." Designated buildings were required to be outstanding in design or building technique, have a high historic or scholarly value, or be typical of a movement or area.

A system for tangible cultural properties was established with two grades: important cultural property and national treasure. The minister of education designated important cultural properties as national treasures if they satisfy "particularly high value from the standpoint of world culture or outstanding treasures for the Japanese people." All previously designated national treasures were initially demoted to the important cultural properties. Some have been designated as new national treasures since June 9, 1951. Following a decision by the National Diet, properties to be nominated as a World Heritage Site are required to be protected under the 1950 law.

=== Recent developments in cultural properties protection ===
National treasures have been designated according to the Law for the Protection of Cultural Properties starting from June 9, 1951. This law is still in effect today and has been supplemented with amendments and additional legislation that reorganized the system of protection and preservation while extending its scope to a wider range of cultural properties. Some of these changes have indirectly affected the protection of designated national treasures.

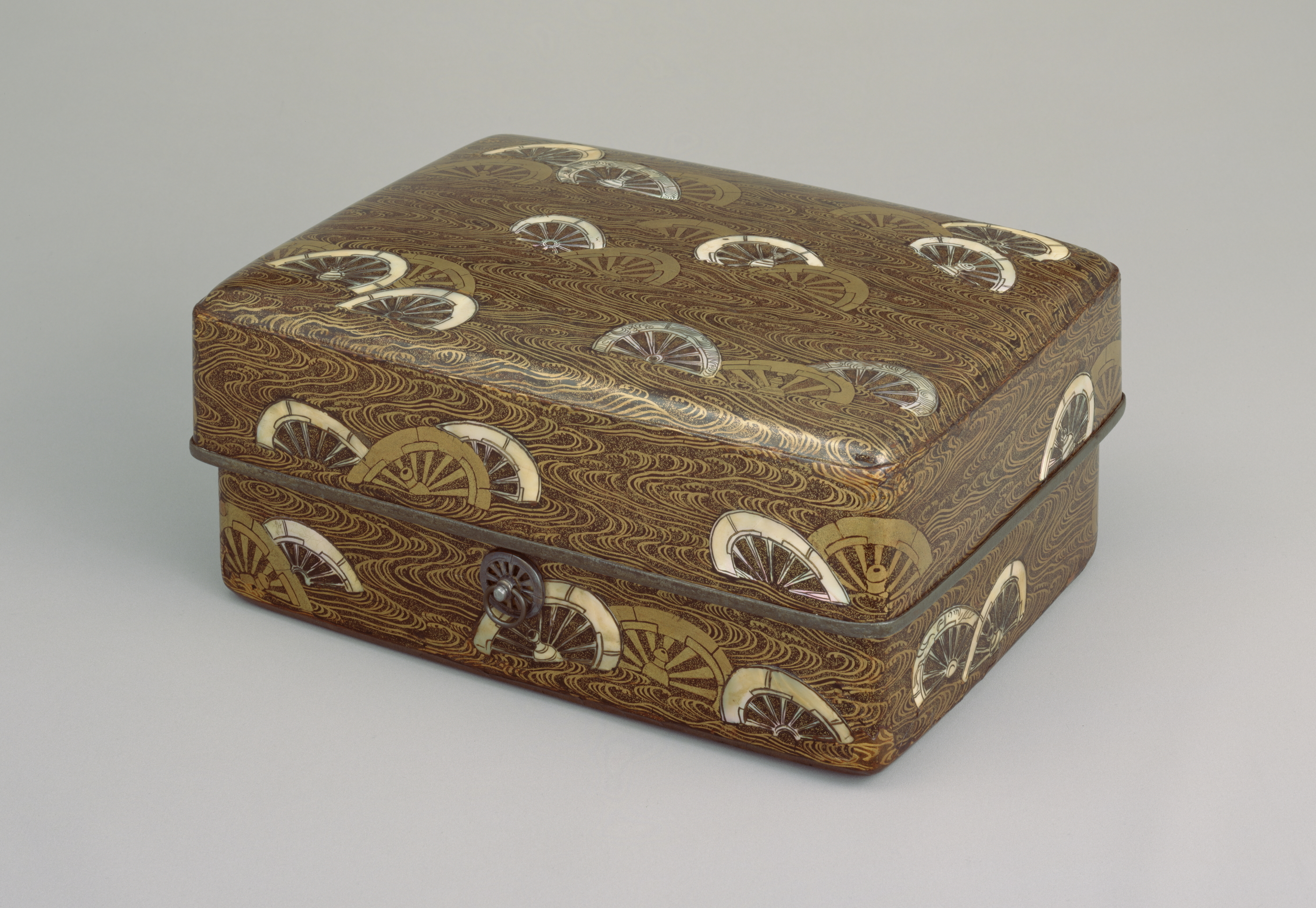
Lacquer toiletry case with cart wheels in stream design

In the 1960s, the spectrum of protected buildings was expanded to include early examples of Western architecture. In 1966, the Law for the Preservation of Ancient Capitals was passed. It was restricted to the ancient capitals of Kamakura, Heijō-kyō (Nara), Heian-kyō (Kyoto), Asuka, Yamato (present day Asuka, Nara), Fujiwara-kyō (Kashihara), Tenri, Sakurai, and Ikaruga, areas in which a large number of national treasures exist. In 1975, the law was extended to include groups of historic buildings not necessarily located in capitals.

The second significant change of 1975 was that the government began to extend protection not only to tangible or intangible properties for their direct historic or artistic value, but also to the techniques for the conservation of cultural properties. This step was necessary because of the lack of skilled craftsmen resulting from industrialization. The techniques to be protected included the mounting of paintings and calligraphy on scrolls; the repair of lacquerware and wooden sculptures; and the production of Noh masks, costumes, and instruments.

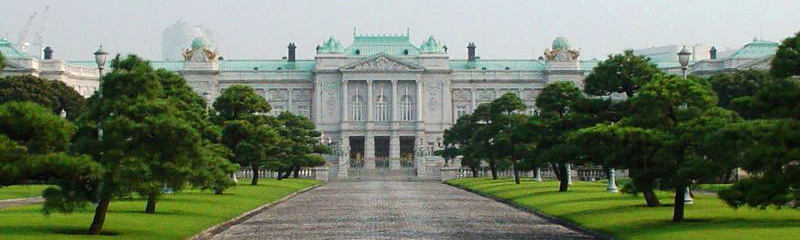
The Akasaka Palace is the only national treasure in the category of modern residences (Meiji period and later).

The two-tier system of "national treasures" and "important cultural properties" was supplemented in 1996 with a new level of registered cultural property for items in significant need of preservation and use. Initially limited to buildings, the newly established level of importance functioned as a waiting list for nominated important cultural properties and as an extension for national treasures. A large number of mainly industrial and historic residences from the late Edo to the Shōwa period were registered under this system. Compared to important cultural properties and national treasures, the registration of Cultural Property entails fewer responsibilities for the owner. Since the end of the 20th century, the Agency for Cultural Affairs has focused on designating structures built between 1868 and 1930 and those in underrepresented regions. The insufficient supply of raw materials and tools necessary for restoration works was recognized by the agency. In 1999, the protective authority was transferred to prefectures and designated cities. As a result of the 2011 Great East Japan earthquake, 714 (Note: 704 items suffered damage. Since some of them have multiple designations, the total count is 714.) cultural properties, including five national treasure buildings, suffered damage. The affected national treasures included the Zuigan-ji (Main Hall and Priest's Quarters), (Note: Cracked walls and pillars, some broken sculptures.) Ōsaki Hachiman-gū, (Note: Slightly broken walls, lacquering and sculptures.) Shiramizu Amidadō, (Note: Slightly broken wall.) and the Buddha Hall of Seihaku-ji. (Note: Broken ranma.)

== Designation procedure ==
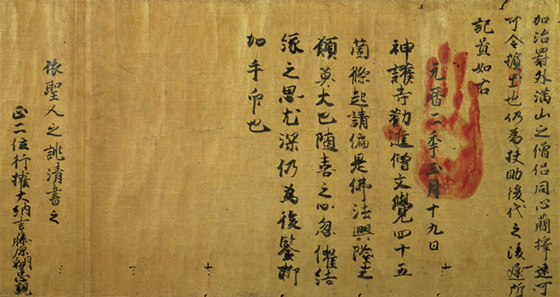
Priest Mongaku's 45-article rules and regulations, a national treasure in the category ancient documents

Cultural products with a tangible form which possessed high historical, artistic, and academic value for Japan are listed in a three-tier system. Properties in need of preservation and use are catalogued as "registered cultural properties". (Note: This applies primarily to works of the modern period, such as houses, public structures, bridges, dikes, fences, and towers threatened by land development and cultural shifts. Registration is a means of preventing the demolition of such structures without requiring an evaluation of their cultural value. Protection measures are moderate and include notification, guidance, and suggestions. As of April 1, 2009, there are 7,407 registered structures.) Important objects are designated as "important cultural properties".

Important cultural properties that show very exceptional workmanship, a particularly high value for world cultural history, or an exceptional value to scholarship can be designated as "national treasures." To achieve the designation, the owner of an important cultural property contacts or is contacted by the Agency for Cultural Affairs for information regarding the registration. In the latter case, the agency always asks the owner for consent beforehand, even though it is not required by law. (Note: It is usually difficult to obtain consent from state properties and private firms.) The agency then contacts the Council for Cultural Affairs, which consists of five members appointed by the minister of education for their "wide and eminent views on and knowledge of culture". The council may seek support from an investigative commission and eventually prepares a report to the Agency for Cultural Affairs. If they support the nomination, the property is placed on the registration list of cultural properties, the owner is informed of the outcome, and an announcement is made in the official gazette. The designation policy is deliberately restrained, keeping the number of designated properties low. In this respect, the South Korean protective system is similar to that of Japan. In the 21st century, up to nine properties were designated every year.

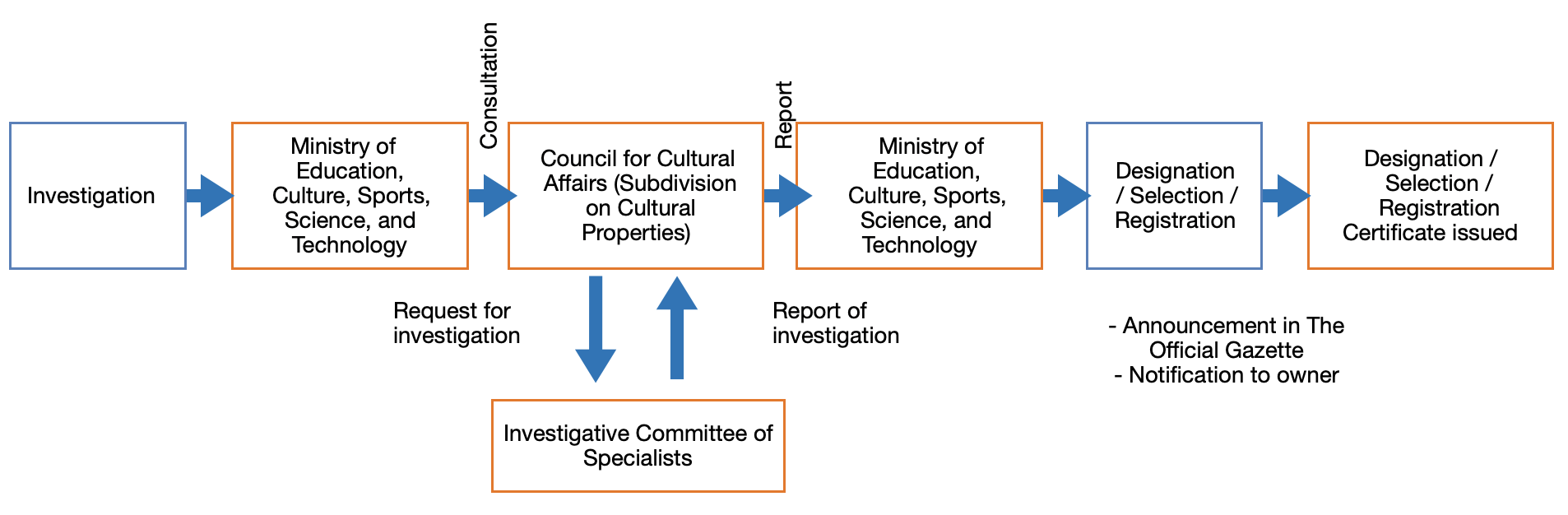

== Categories ==
The Agency for Cultural Affairs designates tangible cultural properties as national treasures in thirteen categories based on type. The agency generally distinguishes between "buildings and structures" (建造物, kenzōbutsu) and "fine arts and crafts" (美術工芸品, bijutsu kōgeihin). Each main category is divided into subcategories. The 235 structural cultural properties are separated into nine categories, and the 916 fine arts and crafts cultural properties are separated into seven categories.

=== Castles ===
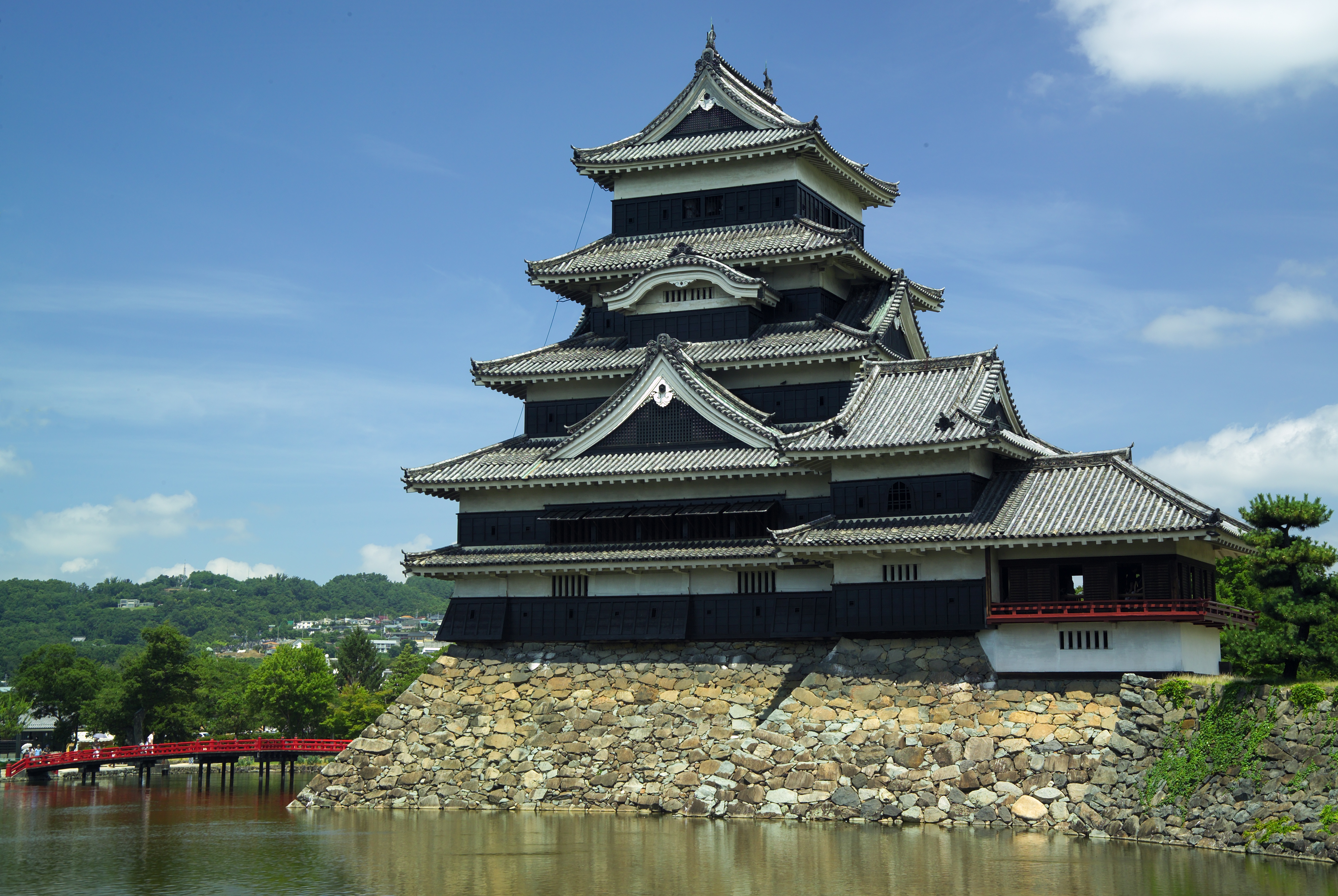
Matsumoto Castle

The category "castles" (城郭, jōkaku) includes nine designated national treasures located at five sites (Himeji Castle, Matsumoto Castle, Inuyama Castle, Hikone Castle, and Matsue Castle) and comprises eighteen structures such as donjons, watch towers, and connecting galleries. Himeji Castle, the most visited castle in Japan and a World Heritage Site, has five national treasures; the other castles each have one. The designated structures represent the apogee of Japanese castle construction, and date from the end of the Sengoku period, from the late 16th to the first half of the 17th century. Built of wood and plaster on a stone foundation, the castles were military fortifications as well as political, cultural, and economic centers. They also served as residences for the daimyō, his family, and his retainers. The oldest structure in the category is a Bunroku-era secondary donjon called the Northwest Small Tower, which is located at Matsumoto Castle.

=== Modern and historical residences ===
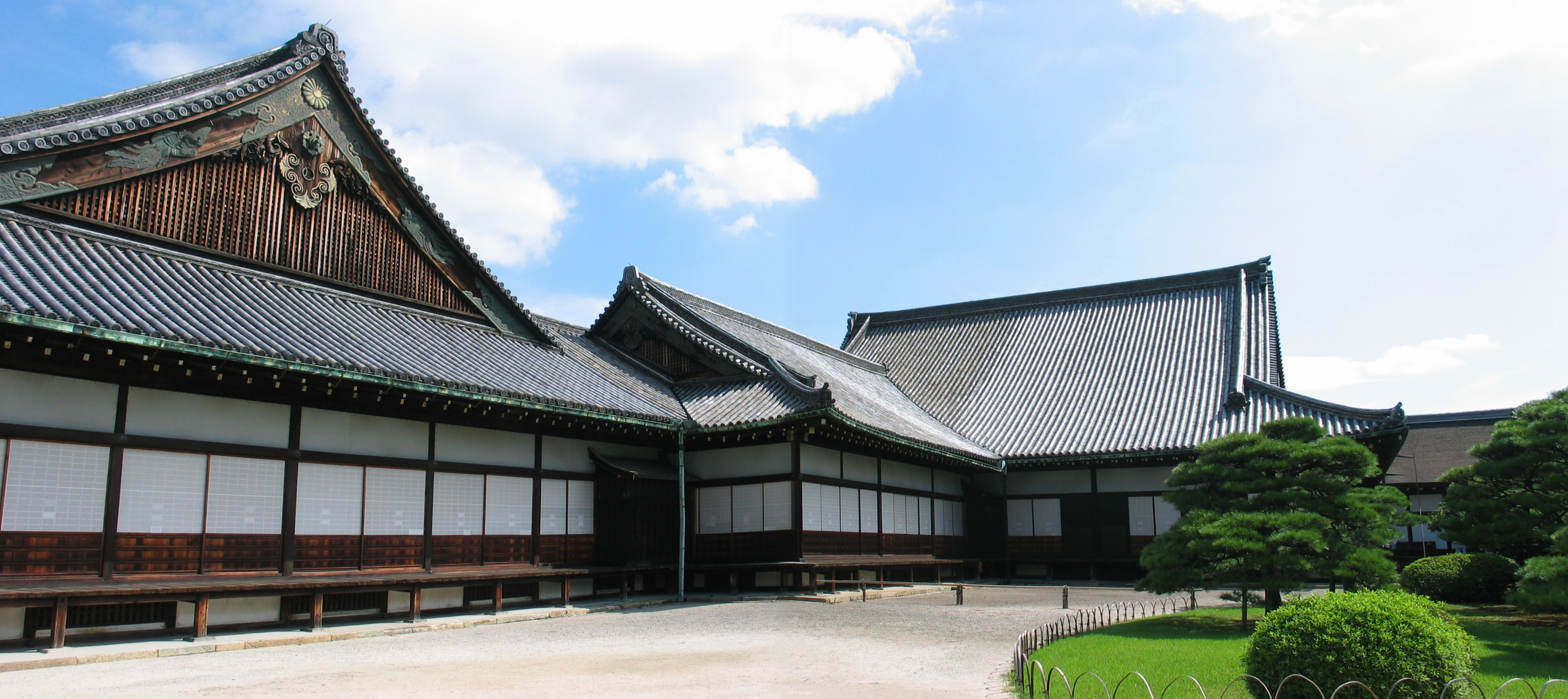
Ninomaru Palace at Nijō Castle

Residential architecture includes two categories: "modern residences" (住居, jūkyo) from the Meiji period onward and "historical residences" (住宅, jūtaku), which date to before 1867. Presently, the only modern residential national treasure is the Akasaka Palace in Tokyo, which was built in 1909. Fourteen national treasures, dating from between 1485 and 1657, were listed in the historical residences category, ten of which are located in Kyoto. The structures include teahouses, shoin, and guest or reception halls.

=== Minka ===
The category minka (民家) contains vernacular houses of particularly high value. The first national treasure designations in this category appeared in 2026 with the addition of two structures in Hyōgo Prefecture. These include the 14th century Hakogi Family Residence, the oldest surviving private residence in Japan and the Furui Family Residence from the 15th century.

=== Structures related to industry, transportation, and public works ===
In 2014, the former Tomioka Silk Mill, Japan's oldest modern model silk reeling factory, was designated as the first national treasure in the category of "structures related to industry transportation and public works" (産業・交通・土木, sangyō kōtsū doboku). Established in 1872 by the government, this is—after the Akasaka Palace—the second modern (post-Meiji) structural national treasure. The designated property includes several buildings, such as the silk reeling mill and the east and west cocoon warehouses.

A second designation was added to this category in 2025 with facilities of the Lake Biwa Canal. These include the 1st, 2nd, and 3rd tunnels, the Keage incline used to transport boats up by 36 metres (118 ft), and the Suirokaku Aqueduct at Nanzen-ji, which was used to supply water to Kyoto's gardens. Built in the mid-Meiji period, the facilities are located in Kyoto and Shiga prefecture.

=== Schools ===
One of Japan's oldest schools, the Kaichi School in Matsumoto, Nagano Prefecture, was designated in 2019 as the only national treasure in the category of "schools" (学校, gakkō). The institution was established shortly after the Meiji Restoration and relocated to the extant western-style building in 1876.

=== Shrines ===
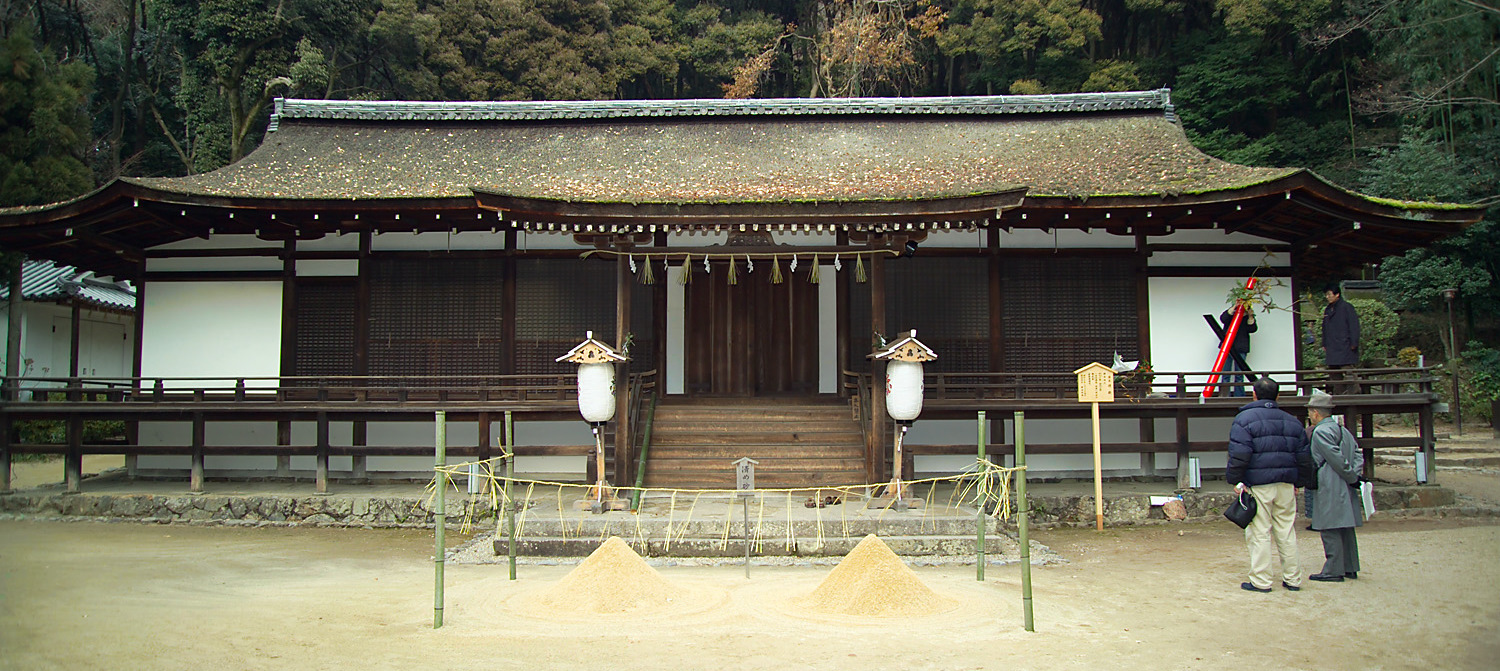
Worship hall (haiden) of Ujigami Shrine

National treasures in the category of "shrines" (神社, jinja) included main halls (honden), oratories (haiden), gates, offering halls (heiden), purification halls (haraedono), and other structures associated with Shinto shrines. Currently, there are 43 national treasures in this category, dating from the 12th century (late Heian period) to the 19th century (late Edo period). According to the tradition of Shikinen sengū-sai (式年遷宮祭), the buildings or shrines were faithfully rebuilt at regular intervals, adhering to the original design. In this manner, ancient styles have been replicated through the centuries to the present day. The oldest designated extant shrine structure is the main hall at Ujigami Shrine, which dates from the 12th century (late Heian period). About half of the designated structures are located in three prefectures: Kyoto, Nara, and Shiga, all of which are in the Kansai region of Japan. Nikkō Tōshō-gū has five national treasures.

=== Temples ===
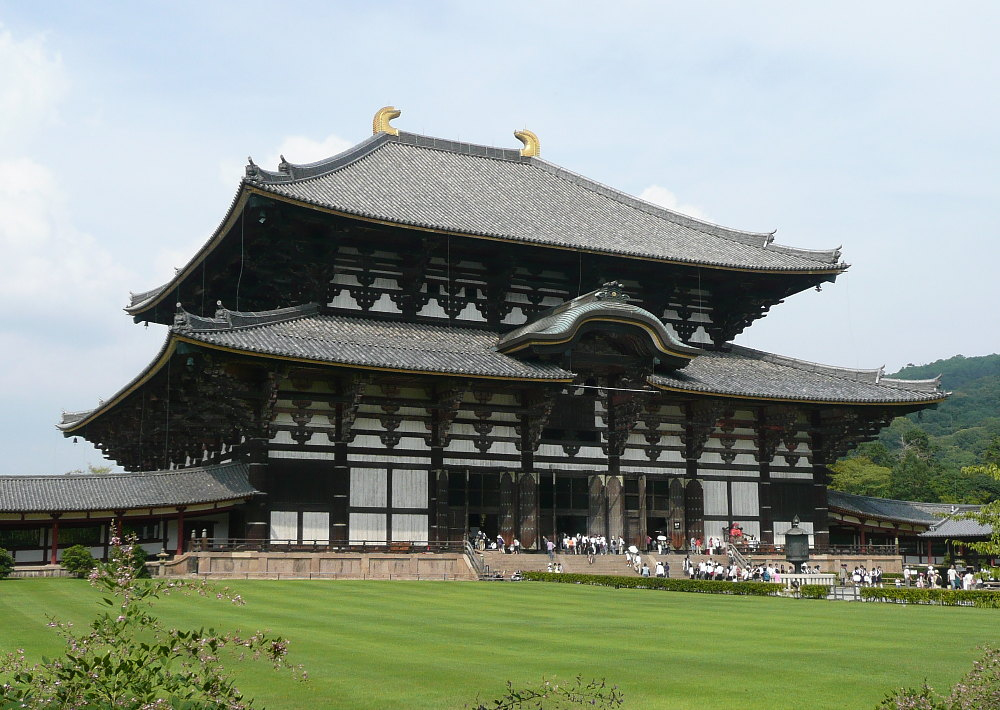
Great Buddha Hall (Daibutsuden) at Tōdai-ji

Structures associated with Buddhist temples, such as main halls (butsuden, hon-dō, and kon-dō), pagodas, belfries, corridors, and other halls or structures, are designated in the category "temples" (寺院, jiin). Presently, 158 national treasures have been designated in this category, including two of the oldest wooden structures in the world—from the 6th century, Hōryū-ji and Tōdai-ji's Daibutsuden, the largest wooden building in the world. The structures cover more than 1,000 years of Japanese Buddhist architecture, from the 6th century (Asuka period) to the 19th century (late Edo period). About three-quarters of the designated properties are located in the Kansai region, with 59 national treasure temple structures in Nara Prefecture and 32 in Kyoto Prefecture. The temple Hōryū-ji has the largest number of designated national treasure buildings, with 18 structures.

=== Miscellaneous structures ===
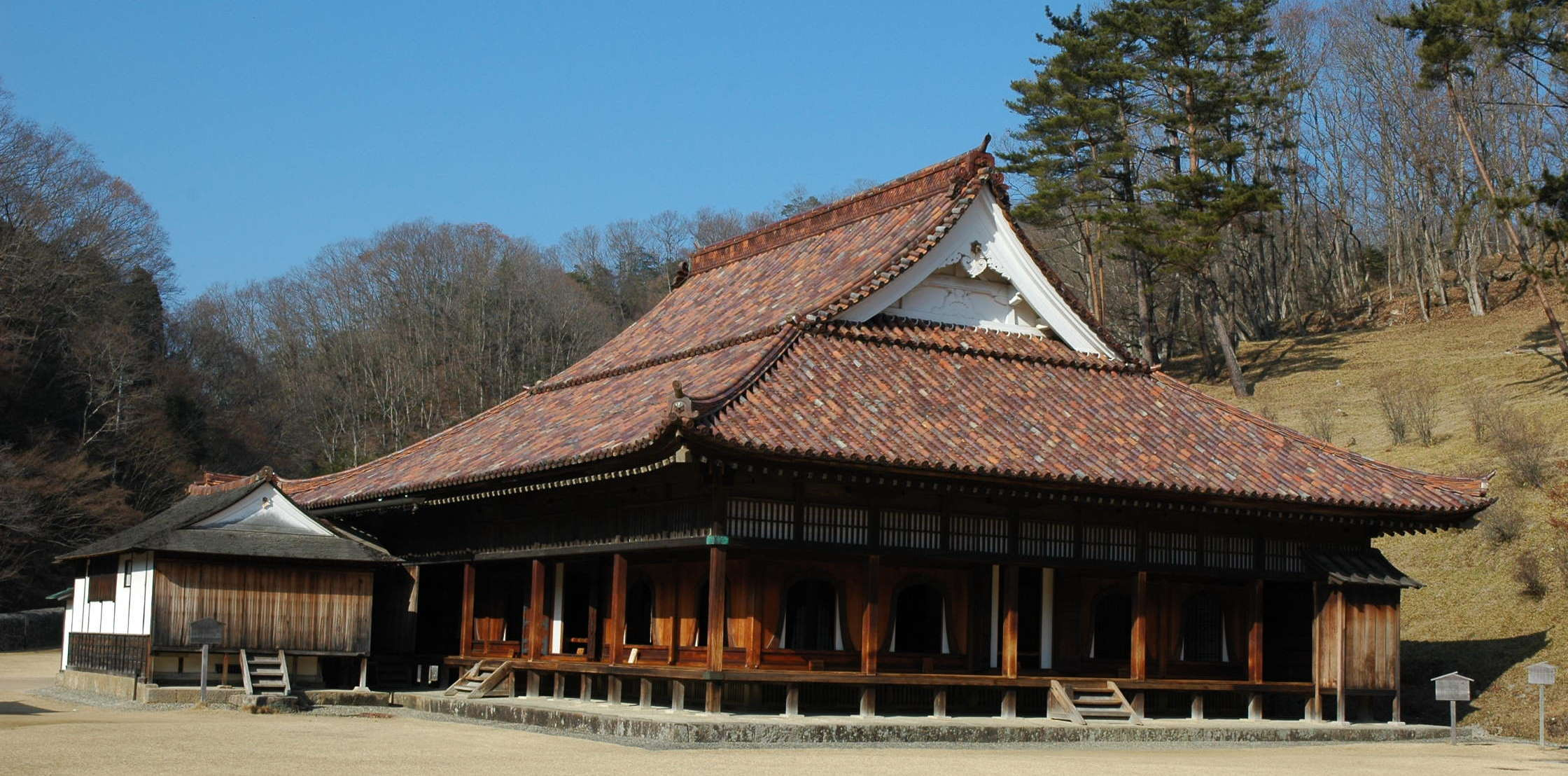
Auditorium of the former Shizutani School

There are five "miscellaneous structures" (その他, sono hoka) that do not fall into any of the other categories. They are the North Noh stage in Kyoto's Nishi Hongan-ji, the auditorium of the former Shizutani School in Bizen, the Roman Catholic Ōura Church in Nagasaki, the Tamaudun royal mausoleum of the Ryukyu Kingdom in Shuri, Okinawa, and the Tsūjun Bridge.

The North Noh stage, dating to 1581, is the oldest extant structure of its kind, consisting of a stage, a side stage for the chorus (脇座, wakiza), a place for musicians (後座, atoza), and a passageway to enter or exit the stage (橋掛, hashigakari).

Built during the mid-Edo period in 1701, the Auditorium of the Shizutani school, an educational institute for commoners, is a single-story building. It has a hip-and-gable (irimoya) tile roof composed of flat, broad, concave tiles and semi-cylindrical convex tiles that cover the seams. The 19.4 m × 15.6 m (64 ft × 51 ft) structure is built of high-quality woods such as zelkova, cedar, and camphor.

Ōura Church was established in 1864 by the French priest Bernard Petitjean of Fier to commemorate the 26 Christian martyrs executed by crucifixion on February 5, 1597, at Nagasaki. The façade of the church faces Nishizaka Hill, the place of their execution. It is a Gothic structure and the oldest extant wooden church in Japan.

Built in 1501 by King Shō Shin, the Tamaudun consists of two stone-walled enclosures and three tomb compartments that, in compliance with tradition, temporarily held the remains of Ryūkyūan royalty.

Tsūjun Bridge is an 84 m (276 ft) long arch bridge and aqueduct built in 1854, used for irrigation and representing the highest level of technology at the time.

=== Ancient documents ===
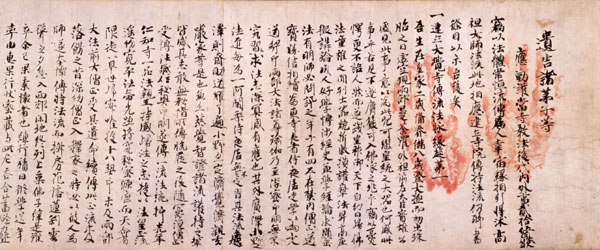
Testament of Emperor Go-Uda with handprints

Valuable Japanese historical documents are designated in the category "ancient documents" (古文書, komonjo). There are 63 items or sets of items in this category, ranging from letters and diaries to records. One national treasure is a linen map, and another is an inscription on stone. However, all other objects in the category were created with a writing brush on paper and, in many cases, present important examples of early calligraphy. The oldest item dates from the late 7th century and the most recent from the 19th century (late Edo period). Approximately half of the entries in the category are located in Kyoto.

=== Archaeological materials ===
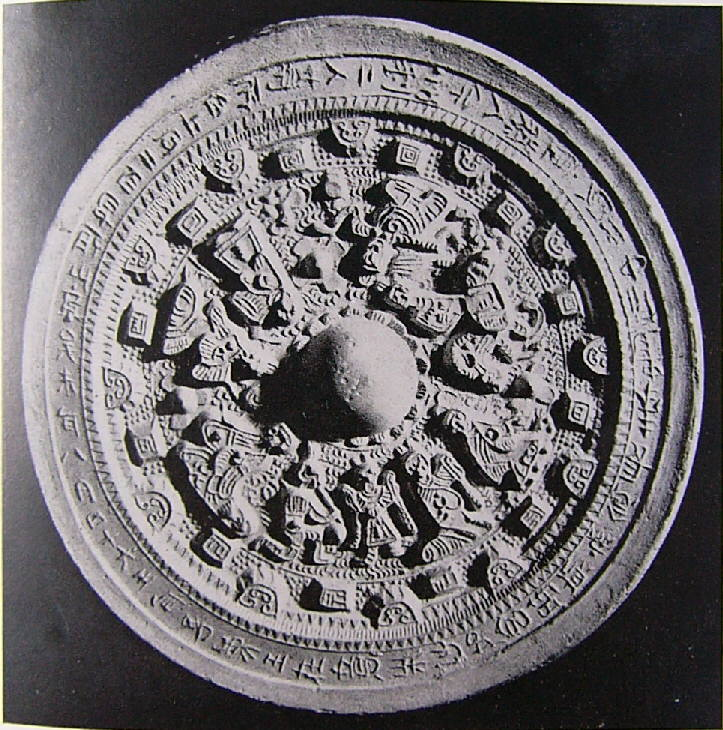
Suda Hachiman Shrine Mirror

The category "archaeological materials" (考古資料, kōkoshiryō) includes some of the oldest cultural properties, with 52 designated national treasures. Many of the national treasures in this category consist of large sets of objects originally buried as part of graves or as offerings for temple foundations, and subsequently excavated from tombs, kofun, sutra mounds, or other archaeological sites. The oldest items are stone tools from the Paleolithic period and flame-shaped pottery and dogū clay figurines from the Jōmon period that reflect early Japanese civilization. Other items listed include bronze mirrors and bells, jewelry, ancient swords, and knives. The most recent object, a hexagonal stone column, dates to the Nanboku-chō period, 1361. Most of the materials (32) are located in museums, with six national treasures in the Tokyo National Museum.

=== Crafts ===
The category "crafts" (工芸品, kōgeihin) includes 254 national treasures, of which 122 are swords and 132 are other craft items.

==== Swords ====
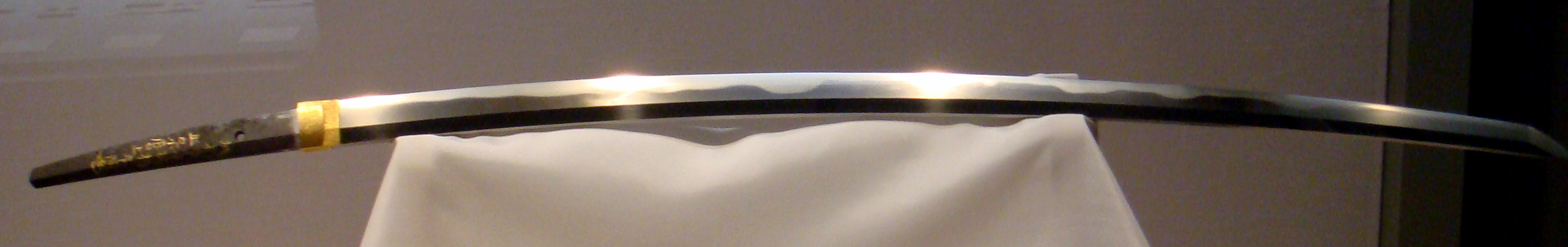
Katana with a gold inlay inscription by Masamune

Swords are included in the crafts category, and either the sword itself or a sword mounting is designated as a national treasure. Currently, 110 swords and 12 sword mountings are national treasures. The oldest designated properties date to the seventh century (Asuka period). However, 86 of the items are from the Kamakura period, with the most recent object from the Muromachi period. The designated items are located in Buddhist temples, Shinto shrines, museums, and private collections.

==== Non-swords ====
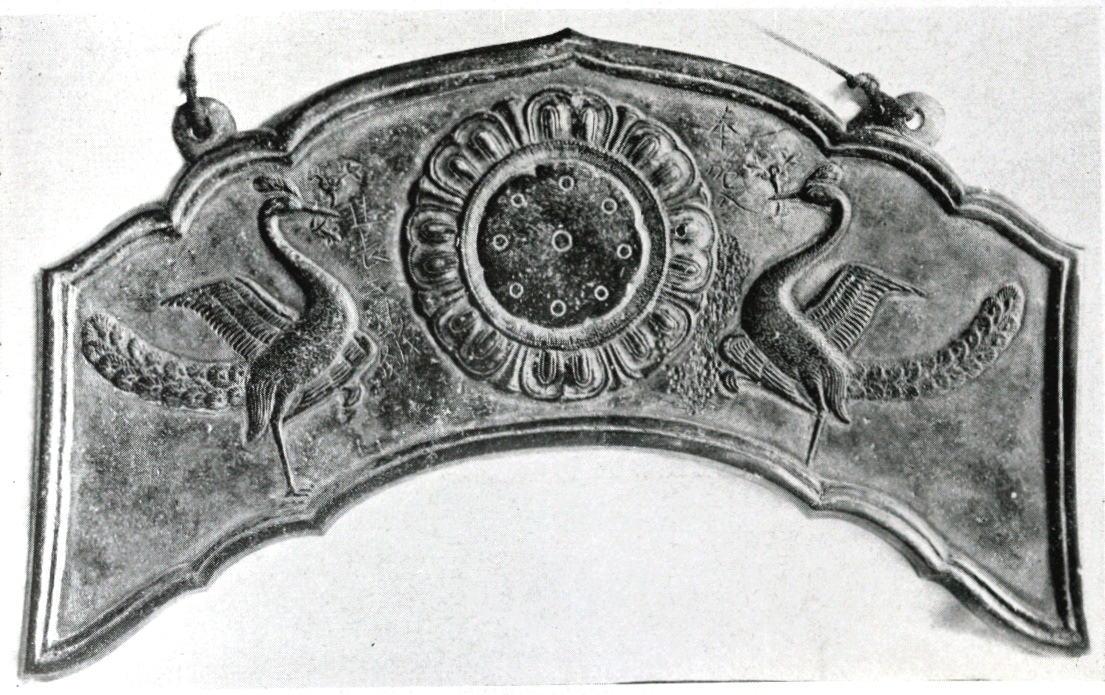
Buddhist ritual gong with peacock relief

The crafts category includes pottery from Japan, China, and Korea; metalworks such as mirrors and temple bells; Buddhist ritual items and others; lacquerware such as boxes, furniture, harnesses, and portable shrines; textiles; armor; and other objects. These items date from classical to early modern Japan —and are housed in Buddhist temples, Shinto shrines, and museums. Also included in this category are sacred treasures that worshippers presented to Asuka Shrine, Tsurugaoka Hachimangū, Itsukushima Shrine, Kasuga-taisha, and Kumano Hayatama Taisha. The treasures were dedicated to the enshrined deity of the respective shrine. They comprise garments, household items, and other items.

=== Historical materials ===
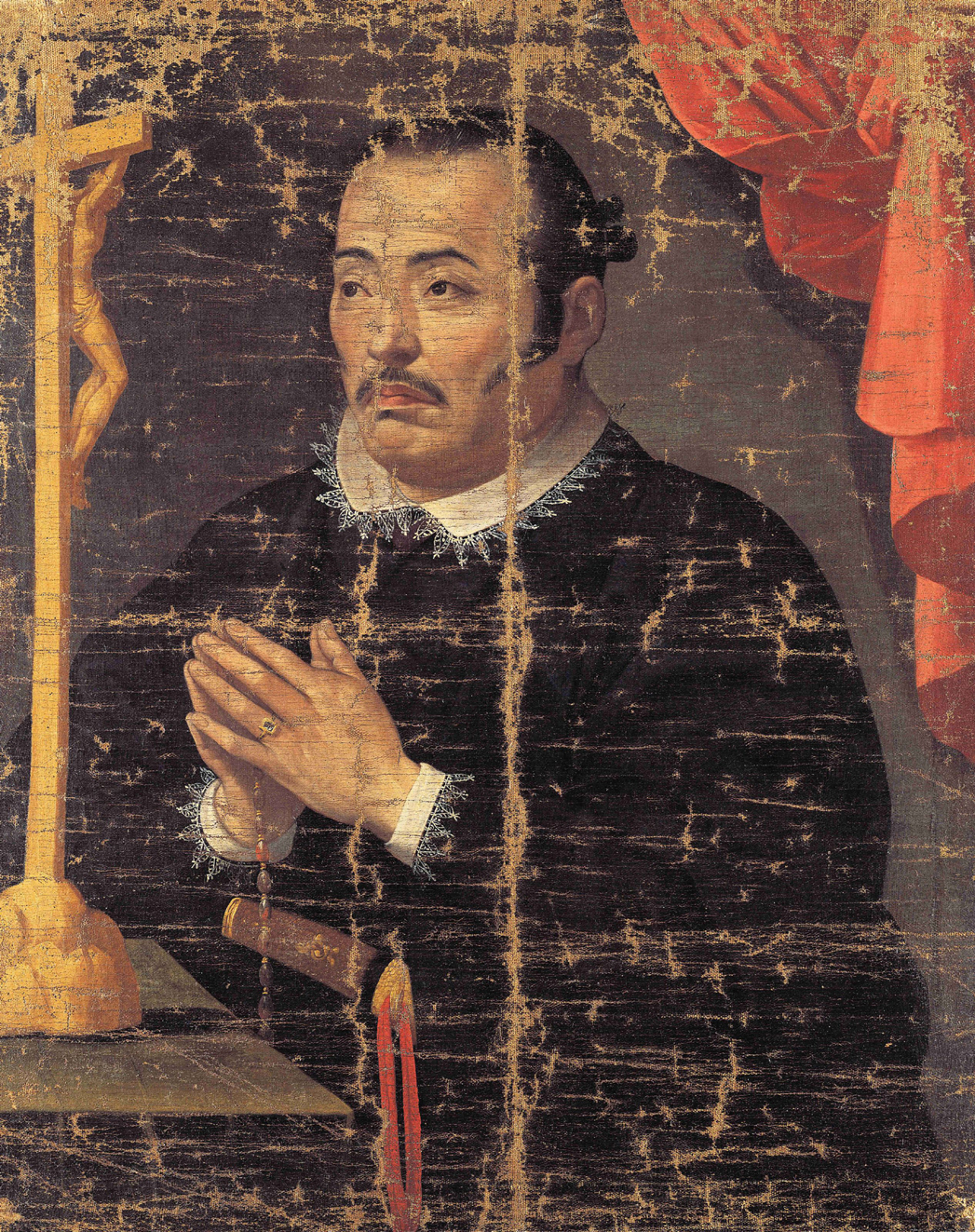
Hasekura Tsunenaga in prayer

Three national treasure sets are catalogued in the category "historical materials" (歴史資料, rekishi shiryō). One set consists of 1,251 items related to the Shō family, the kings of Ryūkyū, who ruled over most of the Ryukyu Islands between the 15th and 19th centuries. The designated items date to the second Shō Dynasty (between the 16th and 19th centuries), and are located in the Naha City Museum of History. Within this set are 1,166 documents or records, including construction plans or registers of funeral items; 85 are craft items, including articles of clothing and furniture.

The second set comprises paintings, documents, ceremonial tools, harnesses, and items of clothing Hasekura Tsunenaga brought back from his 1613 to 1620 trade mission (Keichō Embassy) to Europe. Sent by Date Masamune, Lord of the Sendai Domain, Hasekura traveled via Mexico City and Madrid to Rome before returning to Japan. Located in the Sendai City Museum, the designated set of items consists of 47 objects: a Roman citizenship document dating from November 1615; a portrait of Pope Paul V; a portrait of Hasekura in prayer following his conversion in Madrid; 19 religious paintings; pictures of saints; ceremonial items such as rosaries; a cross and medals; 25 items of harnesses and clothing such as priests' garments; an Indonesian and Benjamin Tenze kris; and a Ceylonese dagger.

A third set consists of 2,345 Edo period items related to the Japanese surveyor and cartographer Inō Tadataka. The designated objects are in custody of the Inō Tadataka Memorial Hall in Katori, Chiba, and include 787 maps and drawings, 569 documents and records, 398 letters, 528 books, and 63 utensils such as surveying instruments.

=== Paintings ===
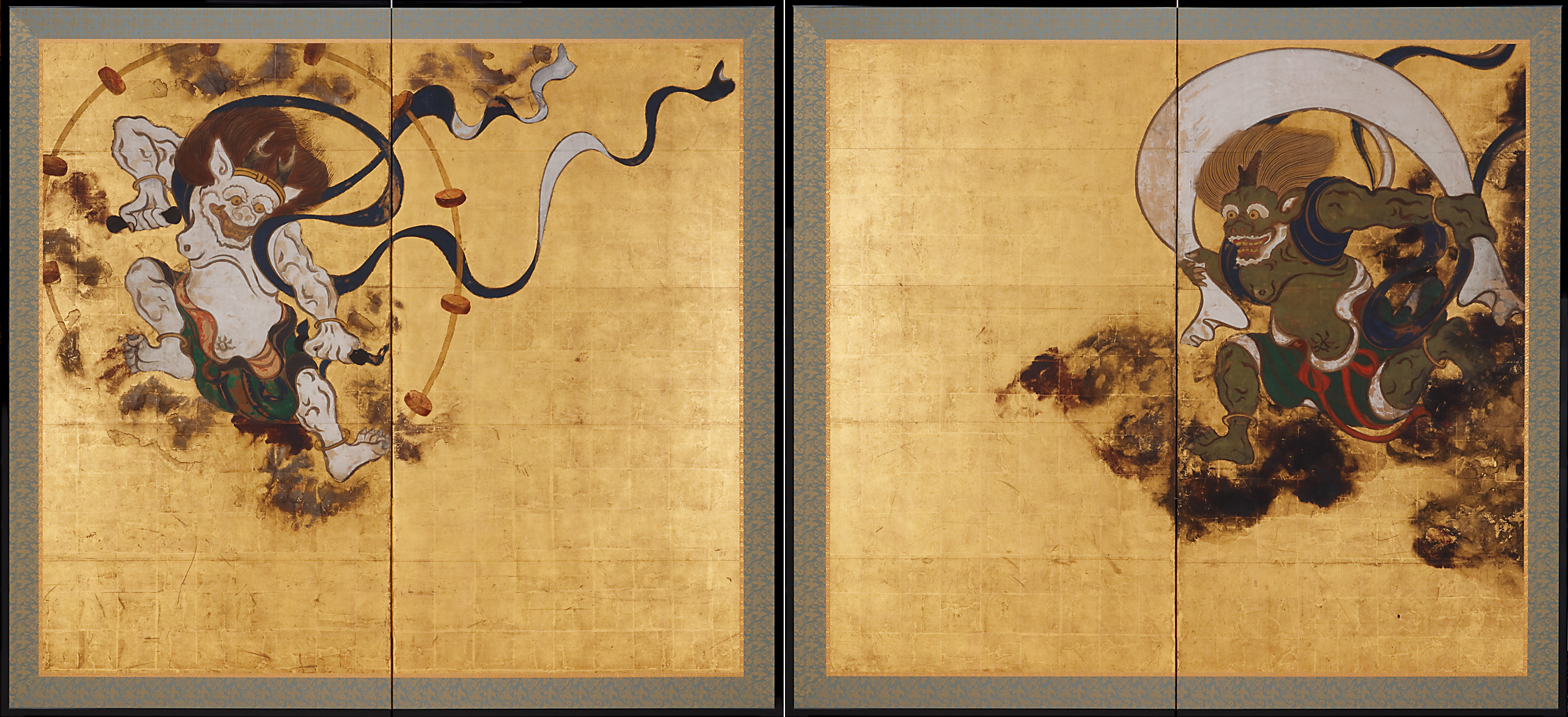
Raijin (thunder god) and Fūjin (wind god) folding screen by Tawaraya Sōtatsu

Japanese and Chinese paintings from the 8th-century Classical Nara period to the early modern 19th-century Edo period are listed in the category "paintings" (絵画, kaiga). The 168 national treasures in the category include Buddhist themes, landscapes, portraits, and court scenes. Various base materials have been used: 93 are hanging scrolls; 40 are hand scrolls or emakimono; 24 are byōbu folding screens or paintings on sliding doors (fusuma); and three are albums. They are located in museums, Buddhist temples, Shinto shrines, private collections, a university, and two tombs (Takamatsuzuka Tomb and Kitora Tomb). A large proportion of items are housed in the national museums of Tokyo, Kyoto, and Nara. The greatest number of national treasure paintings are located in Kyoto, with 52, and Tokyo, with 51. More than half of the Tokyo paintings are located in the Tokyo National Museum.

=== Sculptures ===
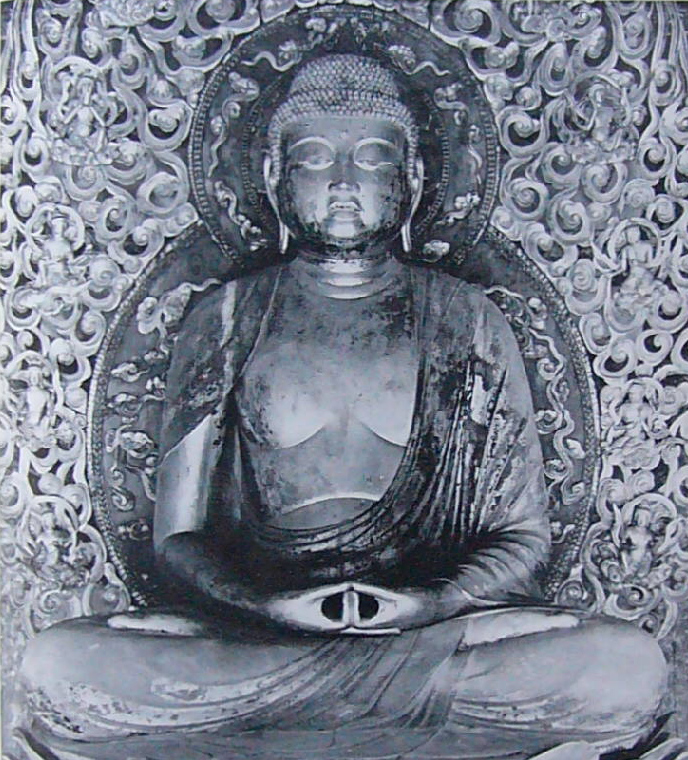
Amida Nyorai, the principal image in the Phoenix Hall of Byōdō-in and only extant work by Jōchō

Sculptures of Buddhist and Shintō deities, or of priests venerated as founders of temples, are listed in the category "sculptures" (彫刻, chōkoku). There are 142 national treasure sculptures or groups of sculptures from the 7th-century Asuka period to the 13th-century Kamakura period. Most (110) sculptures are wooden, twelve entries in the list are bronze, eleven are lacquer, seven are made of clay, and one entry, the Usuki Stone Buddhas, consists of a group of stone sculptures. The statues vary in size from just 10 cm (3.9 in) to 13 m (43 ft) and 15 m (49 ft) for the Great Buddhas of Nara and Kamakura. Seventy-seven of the 142 entries are located in Nara Prefecture, while another 42 are in Kyoto Prefecture. With few exceptions, the sculptures are located in Buddhist temples. Hōryū-ji and Kōfuku-ji are the locations with the most entries, each with 18 designations respectively. The Okura Museum of Art in Tokyo, the Nara National Museum in Nara and the Yoshino Mikumari Shrine in Yoshino, Nara each have a single national treasure in the sculpture category; one national treasure that consists of four sculptures of Shinto gods is located at Kumano Hayatama Taisha; and the Usuki Stone Buddhas belong to Usuki city.

=== Writings ===
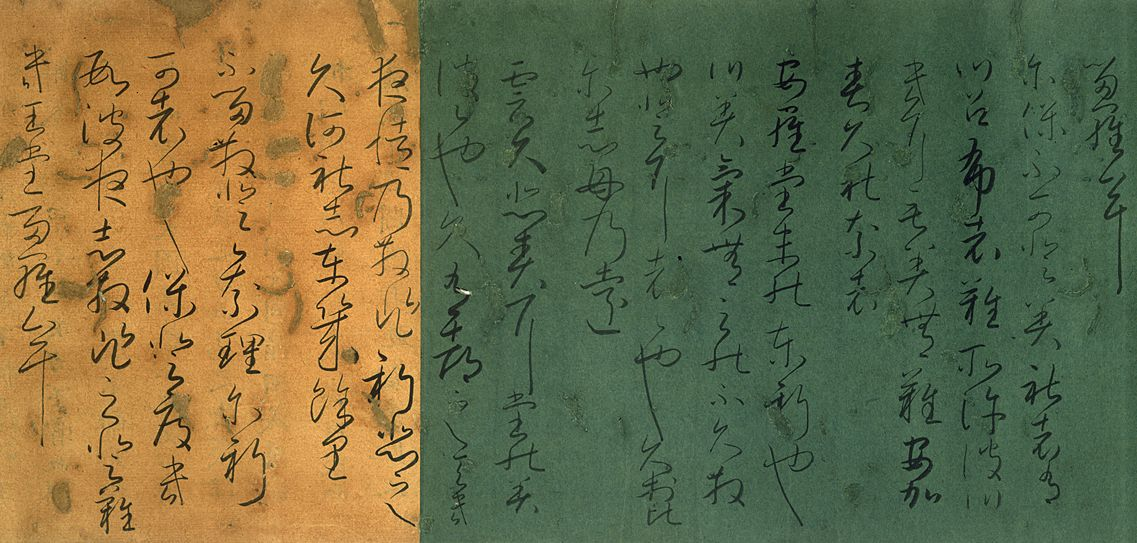
Akihagi-jō attributed to Ono no Michikaze

Written materials of various types, such as sūtra transcriptions, poetry, historical books, and specialist books, are designated in the category "writings" (書跡・典籍, shoseki, tenseki). The 237 items or sets of items are national treasures that date predominantly to classical Japan and the Imperial era of China from the 6th century to the Muromachi period. Most were made with a writing brush on paper and, in many cases, present important examples of calligraphy.

== Preservation and utilization measures ==
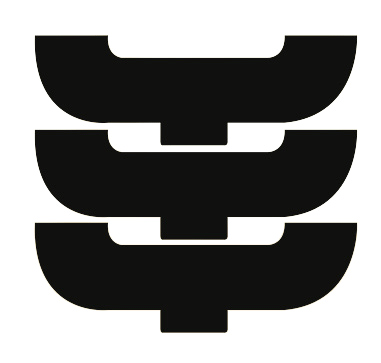
The Protection of Cultural Properties logo in the shape of a tokyō, a type of entablature found in Japanese architecture (Note: The three stacked elements symbolise the continuity in time of cultural property protection: the past, the present, and the future.)

To guarantee the preservation and utilization of designated national treasures, a set of measures was laid down in the "Law for the Protection of Cultural Properties" of 1950. These direct measures are supplemented by indirect efforts aimed at protecting the built environment (in the case of architecture) or techniques necessary for restoration works. (Note: These supplemental measures were added as amendments to the 1950 "Law for the Protection of Cultural Properties".)

The owners or managers of a national treasure are responsible for the administration and restoration of the work. Should the property be lost, destroyed, damaged, altered, moved, or ownership be transferred, they must advise the Agency for Cultural Affairs. Alterations to the property require a permit, and the agency is to be notified 30 days in advance when repairs are conducted. (§ 43). If requested, owners must supply information and report to the commissioner of the Agency for Cultural Affairs regarding the condition of the property (§ 54). If a national treasure is damaged, the commissioner has the authority to order the owner or custodian to repair the property; if the owner is non-compliant, the commissioner may carry out repairs. (Note: For important cultural properties, the commissioner's authority is only to recommend repairs.) If a national treasure is to be sold, the government retains the first option to buy the item (§ 46). Transfers of national treasures are generally restrictive, and export is prohibited.

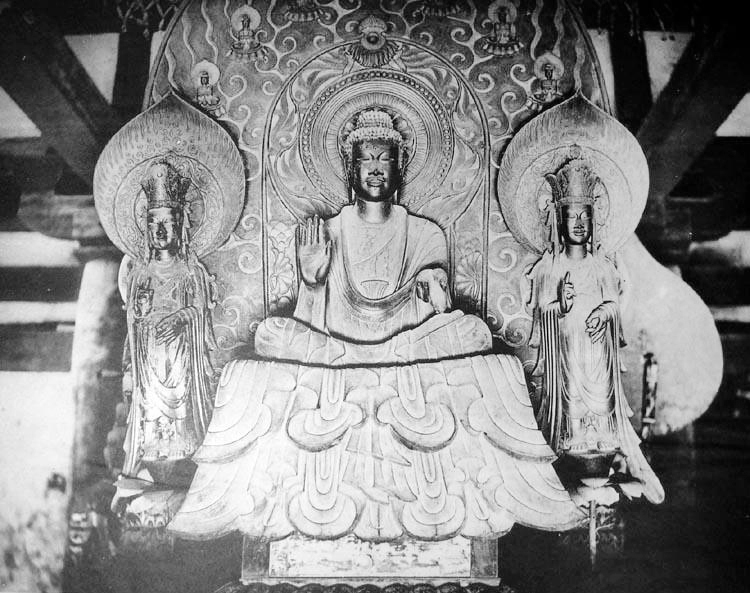
Hōryū-ji's Shakyamuni Triad is a work of Tori Busshi.

If subsidies were granted to the property, the commissioner has the authority to recommend or order public access or a loan to a museum for a limited period. (§ 51). The requirement that private owners must allow access or cede rights to the property has been considered a reason that the properties under the supervision of the Imperial Household Agency have not been designated as a national treasure, with the exception of the Shōsōin and, more recently, five artworks from the Museum of the Imperial Collections. The Imperial Household Agency considers that Imperial properties have sufficient protection and do not require additional protection provided by the Law for the Protection of Cultural Properties. The government satisfies scientific and public interest in cultural properties by a system of documentation, and through the operation of museums and centers for cultural research.

Protection measures are not limited to the responsibilities of ownership. Apart from the prestige gained through the designation, owners are entitled to advantages such as local tax exemption, including fixed assets tax, special property tax, and city planning tax, as well as a reduction of national taxes applied to the transfer of properties.

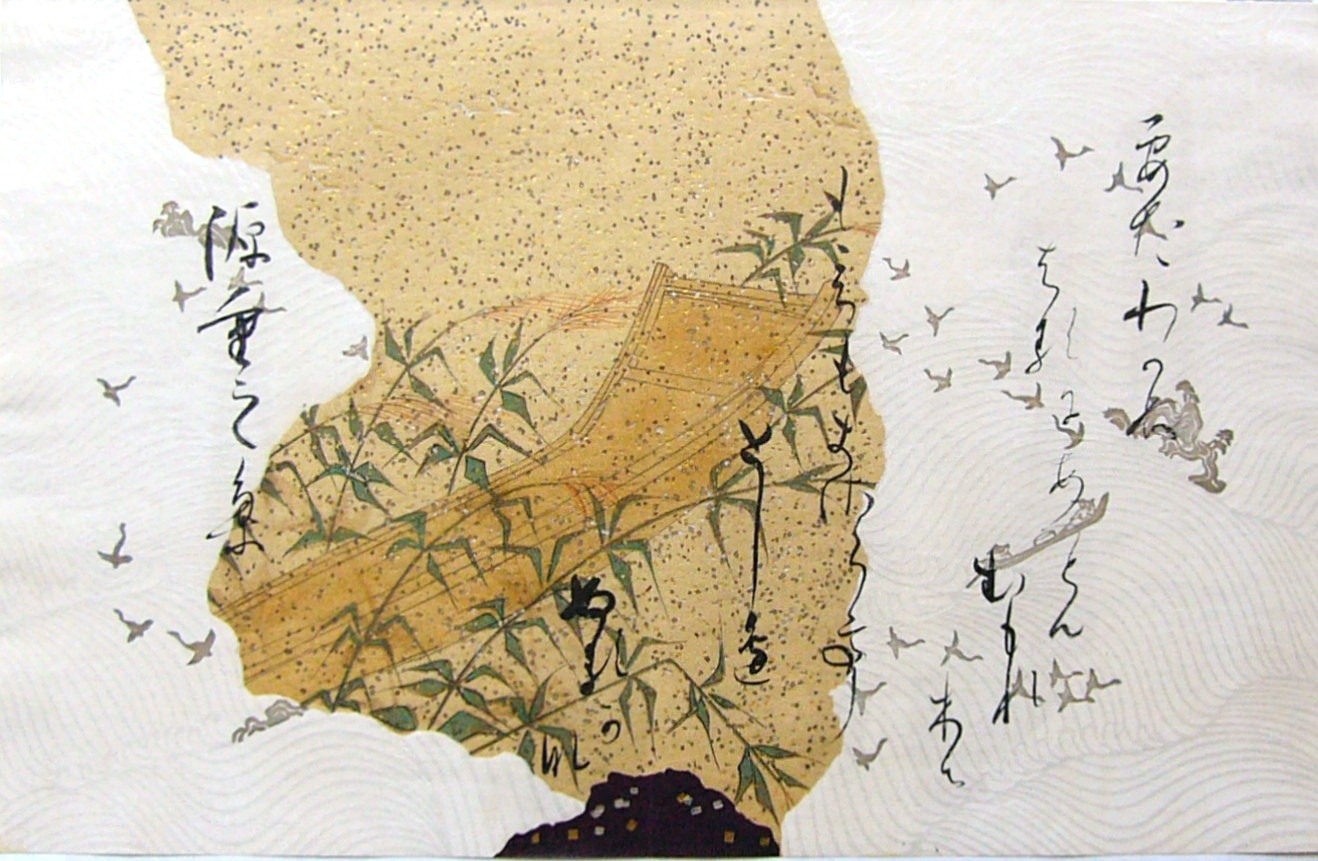
Collection of 36 poems by Emperor Go-Nara

The Agency for Cultural Affairs provides owners or custodians with advice and guidance on matters of administration, restoration, and the public display of national treasures. The agency promotes local activities aimed at the protection of cultural properties, such as activities for the study, protection, or transmission of cultural properties. A custodian can be named for a national treasure (usually a local governing body) if the following circumstances exist: the owner cannot be located, the property is damaged, adequate protection of the property has not been provided, or public access to the property has not been allowed.

The government provides grants for repairs, maintenance, and the installation of fire prevention facilities and other disaster prevention systems. Subsidies are available to municipalities for purchasing land or cultural property structures. Designated properties generally increase in value. The budget allocated by the Agency for Cultural Affairs in fiscal 2009 for the "Facilitation of Preservation Projects for National Treasures and Important Cultural Properties" amounted to 12,013 million yen or 11.8% of the total budget of the agency. Enhancements of Cultural Properties Protection, including the former contingent, were allocated 62,219 million yen, or 61.0% of the total budget.

== Statistics ==
The Agency for Cultural Affairs of Japan publishes the list of national treasures and other designated Japanese cultural artifacts at the Database of National Cultural Properties. As of March 26, 2026, there are 919 national treasures in the arts and crafts category, and 233 in the buildings and structures category. The total number of arts and crafts items, as well as the total number of structures, is actually higher because related objects are sometimes grouped under a common name.

About 89% of structural national treasures are religious. Residences account for 8% of designated buildings; the remaining are castles and miscellaneous structures. More than 90% are wooden buildings, and about 13% of designated buildings are in private ownership. Of the "fine arts and crafts" category, more than 30% of national treasures are written materials such as documents, letters, or books. Swords, paintings, sculptures, and non-sword craft items each account for about 15% of the national treasures in this category.

=== Geographical distribution ===
Distribution of arts and crafts national treasures over the prefectures of Japan

Distribution of building and structural national treasures over the prefectures of Japan

The geographical distribution of national treasures in Japan is highly uneven. Remote areas such as Hokkaido and Kyushu have few designated properties, and most prefectures may only have a couple of national treasure structures. Two prefectures—Miyazaki and Tokushima—do not have any national treasures. (Note: A gilt bronze harness from the Saitobaru kofun in Miyazaki prefecture has been designated as national treasure. It is now located at the Gotoh Museum in Tokyo.)

Four prefectures in the Kansai region of central Honshū each have more than ten national treasure structures: Hyōgo (11), Kyoto (53), Nara (64), and Shiga Prefecture (23). Together they comprise 151 or 65% of all structural national treasures in Japan. Three sites have 93 structural national treasures: Kyoto, the capital of Japan and the seat of the imperial court for more than 1,000 years; Hōryū-ji, founded by Prince Shōtoku around 600; and Nara, capital of Japan from 710 to 784.

Fine arts and crafts national treasures are distributed in a similar fashion, with fewer in remote areas, and a higher concentration in the Kansai region. The seven prefectures of the region harbor 503, or 55%, of all arts and crafts national treasures. Tokyo, which has only two national treasure buildings, has an exceptionally high number of cultural properties in this category. Of the 220 properties located in Tokyo, 89 are at the Tokyo National Museum.

=== Age ===
The designated items provide an overview of the history of Japanese art and architecture from ancient to modern times, with the earliest archaeological national treasures dating back 6,500 years, and the Akasaka Palace dating from the early 20th century. Items from any one of the categories of national treasures may not represent the entire interval of time, but rather a shorter period of time determined by historical events, and coinciding with the time in which the specific artistry or type of architecture flourished.

Temple national treasures cover the time from the late 7th century—about 150 years after the introduction of Buddhism to Japan in the mid-6th century—to the 19th century (early modern Japan). The history of Shinto shrines in Japan is even older than that of temples. However, because of the tradition of rebuilding shrines at regular intervals, known as Shikinen sengū-sai (式年遷宮祭), the oldest designated shrine structures date to the late 12th century. The archetypal Japanese castles are a product of a period of 50 years that began with the construction of Azuchi Castle in 1576, which marked a change in the style and function of castles. Castle construction ended in 1620; the Tokugawa shogunate destroyed the Toyotomi clan in 1615 and subsequently prohibited the building of new castles.

Stone tools dated to 13,000–28,000 BC from the Japanese paleolithic reflect the beginning of human habitation in Japan and have been designated as the oldest national treasures in the "archaeological materials" category.

The first indications of stable living patterns and civilization date to the Jōmon period, from about 14,000 BC to 300 BC. Clay figurines (dogū) and some of the world's oldest pottery, discovered at sites in northern Japan, have been designated as the second oldest national treasures in the "archaeological materials" category. Some of the earliest items in this category are objects discovered in sutra mounds from the Kamakura period.

The starting date of designated "crafts", "writings", and "sculptures" is connected to the introduction of Buddhism to Japan in 552. A proportion of the oldest designated national treasures of these categories were directly imported from mainland China and Korea. After the Kamakura period, the art of Japanese sculpture, which had been mainly religious in nature, deteriorated. Consequently, there are no national treasure sculptures from after the Kamakura period.

== See also ==
- Imperial Regalia of Japan
- Tourism in Japan
- Lists of national treasures of Japan
