= List of cultural properties of Japan – structures (Miyagi) =

This list is of the cultural properties of Japan designated in the category of structures (建造物, kenzōbutsu) for the Prefecture of Miyagi.

== National Cultural Properties ==
As of 1 August 2015, twenty Important Cultural Properties (including three *National Treasures) with forty-two component structures have been designated, being of national significance.

Property	Date	Municipality	Comments	Image	Coordinates	Ref.
*Zuigan-ji Kuri and Corridor 瑞巖寺庫裏及び廊下; Zuiganji kuri oyobi rōka	1609	Matsushima	designation comprises two components		38°22′20″N 141°03′37″E	
*Zuigan-ji Hondō 瑞巖寺本堂(元方丈); Zuiganji hondō (moto hōjō)	1609	Matsushima	formerly the hōjō		38°22′20″N 141°03′34″E	
*Ōsaki Hachimangū 大崎八幡宮; Ōsaki Hachimangū	1607	Sendai			38°16′21″N 140°50′42″E	
Agatsuma Family Residence 我妻家住宅; Agatsuma-ke jūtaku	mid/late Edo period	Zaō	designation comprises four components: the main building (1753), and three storehouses (1805, 1810, 1751-1829)		38°05′00″N 140°39′09″E	
Former Satō Family Residence 旧佐藤家住宅 kyū-Satō-ke jūtaku	mid/late Edo period	Kakuda			37°59′58″N 140°43′05″E	
Former Nakazawa Family Residence 旧中澤家住宅 kyū-Nakazawa-ke jūtaku	mid/late Edo period	Natori			38°09′46″N 140°52′10″E	
Former Tome Kōtō Jinjō Junior School Building 旧登米高等尋常小学校校舎 kyū-Tome kōtō jinjō shōgakkō kōsha	1888	Tome	now the Toyoma Education Museum		38°39′19″N 141°16′47″E	
Kōzō-ji Amida-dō 高蔵寺阿弥陀堂; Kōzōji Amidadō	1177	Kakuda			38°00′00″N 140°43′06″E	
Former Matsumoto Family Residence 松本家住宅 kyū-Matsumoto-ke jūtaku	mid/late Edo period	Kami			38°34′32″N 140°46′00″E	
Zuigan-ji Godaidō 瑞巖寺五大堂; Zuiganji godaidō	1604	Matsushima			38°22′11″N 141°03′51″E	
Zuigan-ji Onarimon 瑞巖寺御成門; Zuiganji onarimon	1609	Matsushima			38°22′18″N 141°03′35″E	
Zuigan-ji Chūmon 瑞巖寺中門; Zuiganji chūmon	1609	Matsushima			38°22′18″N 141°03′35″E	
Ishii Lock 石井閘門; Ishii kōmon	1880	Ishinomaki			38°26′48″N 141°17′28″E	
Ōsaki Hachimangū Nagatoko 大崎八幡宮長床; Ōsaki Hachimangū nagatoko	1661-1672	Sendai			38°16′20″N 140°50′42″E	
Tōshōgū 東照宮手水舎; Tōshōgū	1654	Sendai	designation comprises five components: the honden, karamon, sukibei (fence), zuijinmon, and torii		38°16′49″N 140°53′06″E	
Horaguchi Family Residence 洞口家住宅; Horaguchi-ke jūtaku	1750/60s	Natori			38°10′22″N 140°54′55″E	
Yōtoku-in Tamaya 陽徳院霊屋; Yōtoku-in tamaya	1660	Matsushima	Mausoleum of Date Masamune's wife Megohime		38°22′24″N 141°03′37″E	
Mutsu Kokubun-ji Yakushidō Niōmon 陸奥国分寺薬師堂; Mutsu Kokubunji Yakushidō Niōmon	1607	Sendai			38°15′05″N 140°54′10″E	
Entsū-in Tamaya 圓通院霊屋; Entsū-in tamaya	1647	Matsushima			38°22′17″N 141°03′35″E	
Shiogama Jinja 鹽竈神社; Shiogama Jinja	1647	Shiogama	designation comprises fifteen components: the torii and sayūgū and betsugū haiden of 1663; and sagū, ugū, and betsugū honden, sagū, ugū, and betsugū heiden, sayūgū and betsugū kairō, sayūgū and betsugū mizugaki, gate and kairō, and zuijinmon, all of 1704		38°19′09″N 141°00′46″E	

== Prefectural Cultural Properties ==
As of 1 May 2014, thirty-six properties have been designated at a prefectural level.

Property	Date	Municipality	Comments	Image	Coordinates	Ref.
Kanrantei 観瀾亭; Kanrantei	1592-1596	Matsushima	built for Hideyoshi's Fushimi Castle, transferred to Edo by Date Masamune, and then to Matsushima by Date Tadamune		38°22′10″N 141°03′41″E	
Hakusan Jinja Honden 白山神社本殿; Hakusan Jinja honden	1640	Sendai	with shingle roof since 1668		38°14′45″N 140°54′03″E	
Kakujō-ji Tamaya 覚乗寺高台院霊屋; Kakujōji tamaya	1672	Tome			38°39′29″N 141°16′53″E	
Arikabe Honjin 有壁本陣; Arikabe honjin	1744	Kurihara			38°52′04″N 141°07′28″E	
Suwa Jinja Honden 諏訪神社本殿; Suwa Jinja honden	c.1705	Sendai			38°15′56″N 140°45′31″E	
Tōshōgū Chōzuya 東照宮手水舎; Tōshōgū chōzuya	1654	Sendai			38°16′49″N 140°53′06″E	
Kamo Jinja Honden 賀茂神社本殿; Kamo Jinja honden	1696-7	Sendai	the Shimogamo honden dates to 1696, Kamigamo to 1697		38°19′16″N 140°50′57″E	
Ōsaki Hachimangū Stone Torii 大崎八幡宮石鳥居; Ōsaki Hachimangū ishi-torii	1668	Sendai	repaired in 1907		38°16′20″N 140°50′42″E	
Kōrin-ji Sanmon 香林寺山門; Kōrinji sanmon	1584	Tome			38°36′08″N 141°15′34″E	
Mutsu Kokubun-ji Yakushidō Niōmon 陸奥国分寺薬師堂仁王門; Mutsu Kokubunji Yakushidō Niōmon	1607	Sendai			38°15′05″N 140°54′10″E	
Kannari Junior School Building 金成小学校校舎; Kannari shōgakkō kōsha	1887	Kurihara	remodelled in 1910; now the Kurihara City Kannari Museum of History and Folklore (栗原市金成歴史民俗資料館)		38°48′40″N 141°04′26″E	
Zuigan-ji Sōmon 瑞巌寺総門; Zuiganji sōmon	early Edo period	Matsushima			38°22′20″N 141°03′35″E	
Former Tome Police Station 旧登米警察署庁舎 kyū-Tome keisatsusho chōsha	1888	Tome	now the Police Museum (警察資料館)		38°39′29″N 141°16′23″E	

== Municipal Cultural Properties ==
As of 1 May 2014, one hundred and twenty properties have been designated at a municipal level.

Property	Date	Municipality	Comments	Image	Coordinates	Ref.
Dainen-ji Sōmon 大年寺惣門; Dainenji sōmon	Edo period	Sendai			38°14′13″N 140°52′44″E	
Jōkaku-ji Sanmon 成覚寺山門(旧浄眼院殿霊屋門); Jōkakuji sanmon (kyū-Jōgan-in den tamaya mon)	1687	Sendai			38°15′18″N 140°53′21″E	
Rinnō-ji Sanmon 輪王寺山門; Rinnōji sanmon	1691	Sendai		The wooden front entry gate to Rinnoji temple.	38°17′00″N 140°51′33″E	

== Registered Cultural Properties ==
As of 1 August 2015, ninety-seven properties at thirty-three sites have been registered (as opposed to designated) at a national level.

Property	Date	Municipality	Comments	Image	Coordinates	Ref.
Ōsaki Hachimangū Shamusho 大崎八幡宮社務所; Ōsaki Hachimangū shamusho	late Taishō period	Sendai			38°16′18″N 140°50′40″E	
Ōsaki Hachimangū Former Chief Priest's Quarters 大崎八幡宮旧宮司宿舎; Ōsaki Hachimangū kyū-gūji shukusha	late Taishō period	Sendai			38°16′17″N 140°50′40″E	
Ōsaki Hachimangū Shinmesha 大崎八幡宮神馬舎; Ōsaki Hachimangū shinmesha	late Taishō period	Sendai	renovated in 2010		38°16′18″N 140°50′43″E	

== See also ==
- Cultural Properties of Japan
- National Treasures of Japan
- List of Historic Sites of Japan (Miyagi)
- List of Cultural Properties of Japan - paintings (Miyagi)
