= List of cultural properties of Japan – historical materials (Miyagi) =

This list is of the cultural properties of Japan designated in the category of historical materials (歴史資料, rekishi shiryō) for the prefecture of Miyagi.

== National Cultural Properties ==
As of 1 July 2019, four Important Cultural Properties (including one *National Treasure) have been designated, being of national significance.

Property	Date	Municipality	Ownership	Comments	Image	Coordinates	Ref.
*Materials relating to the Keichō Mission to Europe 慶長遣欧使節関係資料; Keichō ken ō shisetsu kankei shiryō	1613–20	Sendai	Sendai City Museum	47 items, comprising a parchment certificate of citizenship of Rome, oil paintings on canvas of Hasekura Tsunenaga and Pope Paul V, an oil painting on copper plate of the Virgin Mary, a chasuble, three crosses (one accompanied by a medal of the Virgin Mary, six medal fragments, five rosaries, a disciplina (ディスチプリナ), teka (テカ) and bag, a reliquary, two saddles, two stirrups, two bridles, two horse fittings, a cloak and trousers, a wall hanging, a striped cloth, two daggers, two seals, and ten metal clasps; the certificate and paintings of Tsunenaga and the Pope, alongside 94 related documents from two archives in Spain, have been placed on the UNESCO Memory of the World International Register		38°15′21″N 140°51′25″E	
A Map of the Myriad Countries of the World 坤輿万国全図〈（版本）／〉 konyo bankoku zenzu (hanpon)	1602	Sendai	Miyagi Prefectural Library (宮城県図書館)	6 widths; printed edition		38°20′46″N 140°50′19″E	
Sendai Domain Astronomical Instruments 仙台藩天文学器機; Sendai-han tenmongaku kiki	C18/19	Sendai	Sendai Astronomical Observatory (仙台市天文台)	4 items		38°15′24″N 140°45′19″E	
Materials relating to the Territory of Sendai in Mutsu Province for the Genroku Kuniezu 陸奥国仙台領元禄国絵図関係資料; Mutsu-no-kuni Sendai-ryō Genroku kuni-ezu kankei shiryō	1697–1702	Sendai	Miyagi Prefectural Library (宮城県図書館)	265 items		38°20′46″N 140°50′19″E	

== Prefectural Cultural Properties ==
As of 1 May 2019, twelve properties have been designated at a prefectural level.

Property	Date	Municipality	Ownership	Comments	Image	Coordinates	Ref.
Map of the Area around Sendai Castle 仙台城下絵図; Sendai-jōka ezu	Edo period	Sendai	Miyagi Prefectural Library (宮城県図書館)	a number of samurai residences are named		38°20′46″N 140°50′19″E	
Maps of Sendai Castle 仙台城絵図; Sendai-jō ezu	Edo period	Sendai	Miyagi Prefectural Library (宮城県図書館)	15 items		38°20′46″N 140°50′19″E	
Map of Sendai Businesses and Edo Residence 仙台別業・江戸屋敷等絵図; Sendai betsugō Edo yashiki tō ezu	Edo period	Sendai	Miyagi Prefectural Library (宮城県図書館)			38°20′46″N 140°50′19″E	
Map of the Castle, Fortifications, and Residences 城・要害・在郷屋敷絵図; Shiro・yōgai・zaikyō yashiki ezu	Edo period	Sendai	Miyagi Prefectural Library (宮城県図書館)			38°20′46″N 140°50′19″E	
Map of the Territory 領内図; Ryōnai zu	Edo period	Sendai	Miyagi Prefectural Library (宮城県図書館)			38°20′46″N 140°50′19″E	
Map of the Territory's Enclaves 飛地領絵図; Tobichi ryōnai zu	Edo period	Sendai	Miyagi Prefectural Library (宮城県図書館)			38°20′46″N 140°50′19″E	
Map relating to Ezo 蝦夷地関係絵図; Ezo-chi kankei ezu	C19	Sendai	Miyagi Prefectural Library (宮城県図書館)			38°20′46″N 140°50′19″E	
Map of the Borders 境絵図; Sakai ezu	Edo period	Sendai	Miyagi Prefectural Library (宮城県図書館)			38°20′46″N 140°50′19″E	
Map by Inō Tadataka 伊能図(中図); Inō zu (Naka zu)	Edo period	Sendai	Miyagi Prefectural Library (宮城県図書館)	the middle-sized of the three maps he made		38°20′46″N 140°50′19″E	
Materials relating to the Festivals of Sendai 仙台祭絵関係資料; Sendai matsuri kankei shiryō	Edo period	Sendai	Miyagi Prefectural Library (宮城県図書館)	designation comprises ten leaves relating to the 1791 float festival at Sendai Tōshōgū and an emakimono on the same subject		38°20′46″N 140°50′19″E	
Kuniezu Map of the Territory of Sendai in Ōshū in the Shōhō Era (Copy) 国絵図 正保年間奥州仙台領絵図（写） Kuni ezu Shōhō nenkan Ōshū Sendai-ryō ezu (utsushi)	1644	Sendai	Sendai City Museum	a copy of that submitted by the Sendai Domain to the Edo bakufu		38°15′22″N 140°51′24″E	
Map of the Province 国絵図; Kuni ezu	Edo period	Sendai	Miyagi Prefectural Library (宮城県図書館)			38°20′46″N 140°50′19″E	

== See also ==
- Cultural Properties of Japan
- List of National Treasures of Japan (historical materials)
- List of Historic Sites of Japan (Miyagi)
- List of Cultural Properties of Japan - paintings (Miyagi)
- Mutsu Province
- Tōhoku History Museum
