= Shiogama shrine =

Shinto shrine in Japan

Shiogama Jinja 鹽竈神社
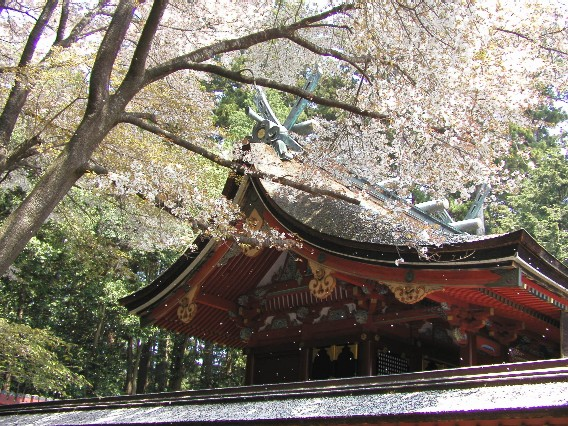
- Shiogama Shrine in the spring

- Location within Miyagi Prefecture Location within Japan

Religion
- Affiliation: Shinto
- Festival: July 10
- Type: Shiogama Jinja

Location
- Location: 1-1 Ichimoriyama, Shiogama-shi, Miyagi-ken 985-8510
- Coordinates: 38°19′9″N 141°0′43″E

Architecture
- Style: Nagare-zukuri

Website
- www.shiogamajinja.jp

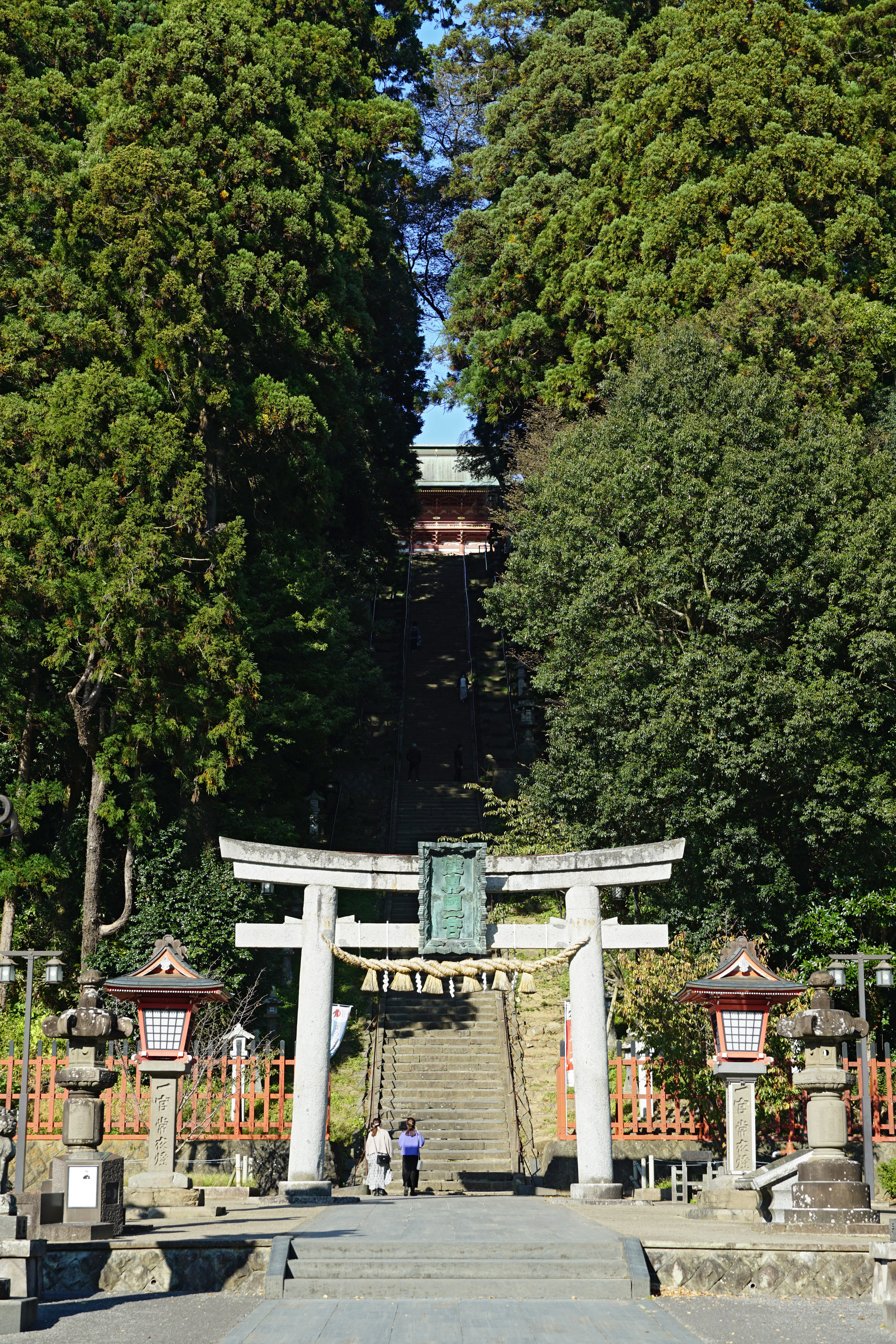
Omotesando

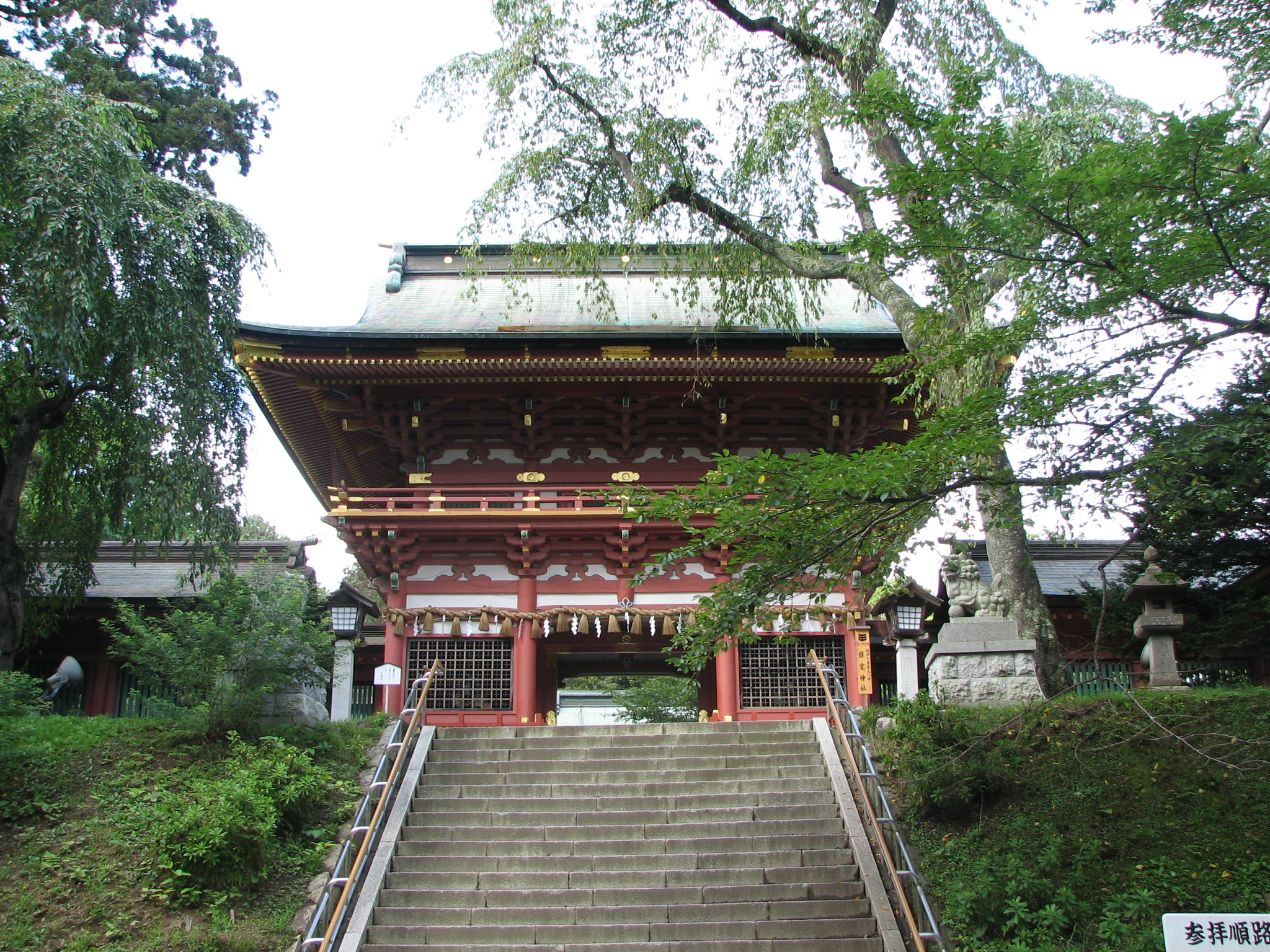
Zuishinmon (1704), Important Cultural Property

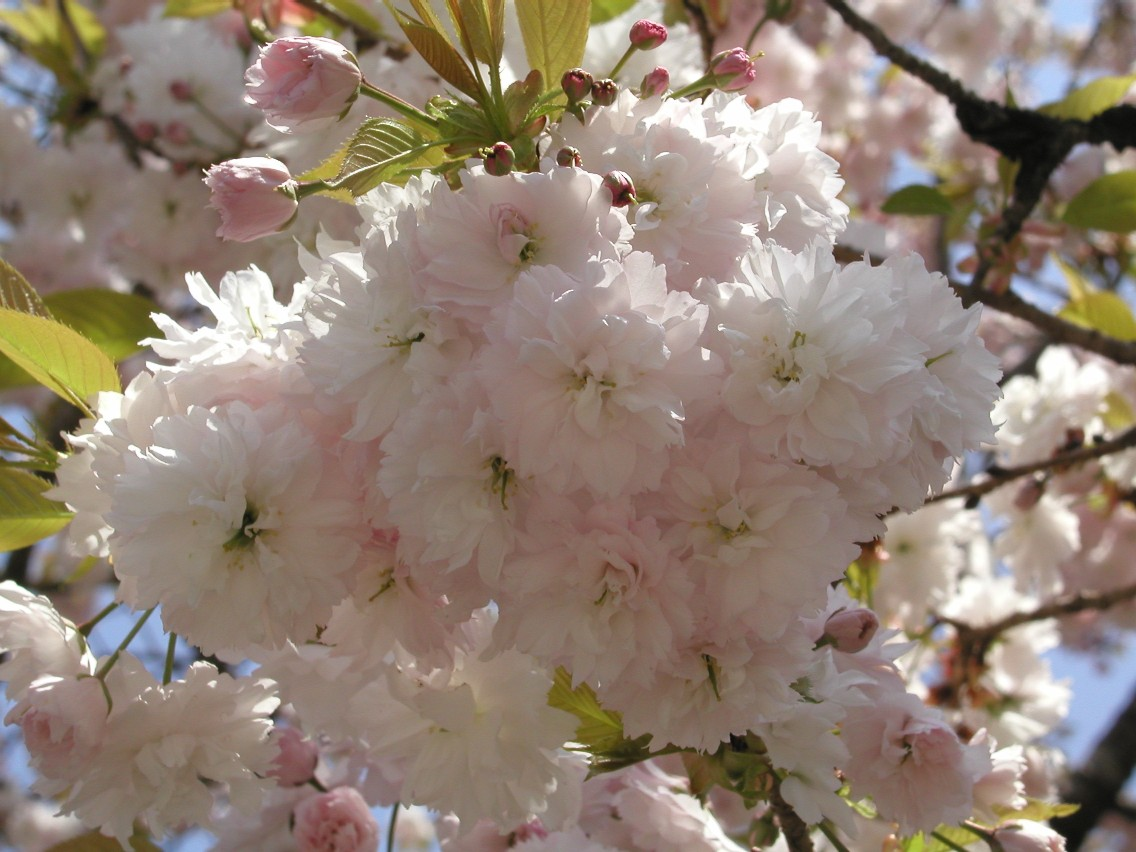
Shiogama-zakura (Prunus lannesiana cv shiogama), Natural Monument

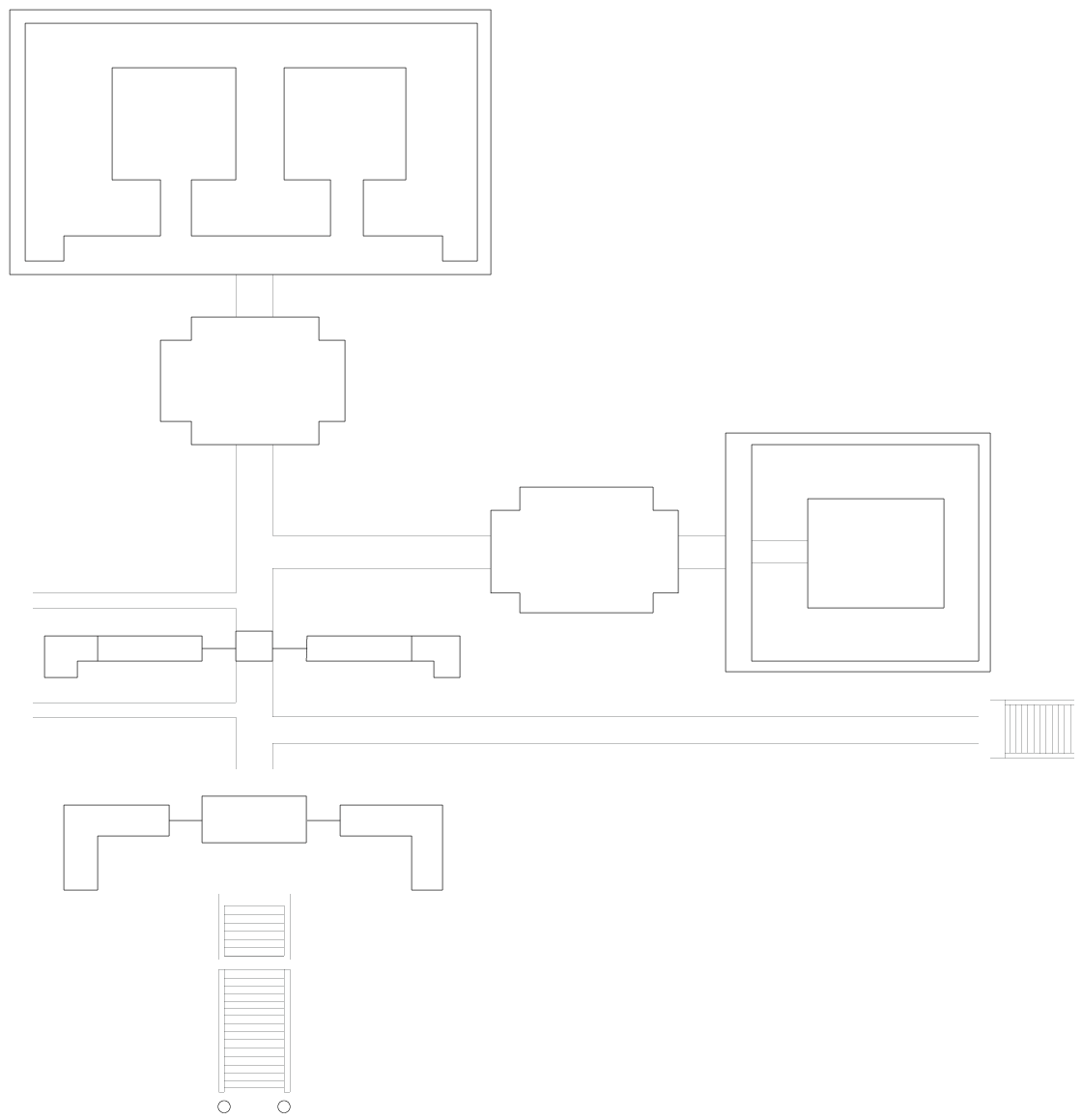

Shiogama Jinja (鹽竈神社) is a Shinto shrine in the city of Shiogama, Miyagi Prefecture, in the Tōhoku region of northern Japan. Known from the ninth century, fifteen of its buildings have been designated Important Cultural Properties. It is the head shrine of several hundred Shiogama shrines located throughout Japan. The kami of Shiogama Jinja have long been worshipped as guardian deities of seafarers, notably fisherman, and of pregnant women.

Bashō recounts his visit in Oku no Hosomichi, describing the magnificent pillars, painted ceiling, long flight of stone steps, votive lanterns, and the 'sparkle of the vermilion fence in the morning sun'.

== Enshrined kami ==
Three kami are enshrined at Shiogama Jinja, in three separate buildings: Shiotsuchi-Oji-no-Kami in the betsugu (detached sanctuary), Takemikazuchi-no-Kami in the sagu (left sanctuary), and Futsunushi-no-Kami in the ugu (right sanctuary). Shiwahiko Jinja is dedicated to another kami, Shiwahiko-no-Kami.

=== Shiwahiko Jinja ===
Within the precincts of Shiogama Jinja is the Shiwahiho Jinja, another shrine with a long history and important rank within Shinto shrine hierarchy. It was formerly situated in Iwakiri, to the west of Shiogama, but it was transferred to the precincts of Shiogama Jinja in 1874. The present buildings were completed in 1938. Both the Haiden and the Heiden are lacquered in vermilion and black and are designated as important cultural assets of Shiogama city. The deity of this shrine is regarded as a guardian of agriculture.

== History ==
The construction of Shiogama Jinja dates to before the historic era. Per shrine legend, the Sun Goddess, Amaterasu-Omikami, specifically commanded Takemikazuchi-no-Kami and Futsunushi-no-Kami, to develop the Tōhoku area. A third kami, Shiotsuchi-Oji-no-Kami, guided the other two to this region. After their arrival, the area enjoyed a period of peace, and Shiotsuchi-Oji-no-Kami taught the local people how to make salt from sea water. In gratitude, a shrine was erected to the three kami.

Shiogama Jinja appears in historical records in 820 AD, when it was given exemption from taxes. The shrine was appointed the ichinomiya of Mutsu Province and is named in the 927 AD Engishiki records. During the Heian period, the shrine received donations periodically from various Emperors, and was patronized also by local warrior clans, such as the Northern Fujiwara. During the Edo period, the shrine came within the territory of the Date clan of Sendai Domain. Starting with Date Masamune, the Date clan heavily patronized the shrine, and many of the current buildings date from the period of their rule.

After the Meiji restoration and the establishment of State Shinto, the shrine was given the rank of Kokuhei Chūsha (National shrine, 2nd rank).

== Layout ==
The shrine is approached by a steep stone stairway of 202 steps with a vermilion-lacquered Zuishinmon gate at the top. Beyond the Zuishinmon is a second gate flanked on either side by corridors. beyond this gate are the Haiden and two of three Heiden and Honden that are the sanctuaries of the deities, with a separate Haiden/Heiden and Honden dedicated to Shiotsuchi-Oji-no-Kami at a right angle. Each Honden is built in plain wood in the nagare-zukuri-style of Shinto architecture. The three sanctuaries, on the other hand, are lacquered in vermilion, in the Irimoya-zukuri style.

Also of note within the precincts are a stone sundial dedicated in 1792 and a 14-foot high lantern of iron and copper that was donated in 1807.

== Cultural Properties ==
Of the structures at Shiogama Jinja, 14 are collectively designated as a National Important Cultural Property. The shrine also has a number of treasures, and a museum built in 1996 houses a number of these, including swords, armor, documents and art objects. Also on display are materials related to salt manufacture.

=== National Important Cultural Properties ===
- Saigū-Honden (左宮本殿), Edo period (1704)
- Ugū-Honden (右宮本殿), Edo period (1704)
- Saigū-Heiden (左宮幣殿), Edo period (1704)
- Ugū-Heiden (右宮幣殿), Edo period (1704)
- Saiyūgū-Kairō (左右宮廻廊), Edo period (1704)
- Saiyūgū- Mizugaki (左右宮瑞垣), Edo period (1704)
- Saiyūgū-Haiden (左右宮拝殿), Edo period (1663)
- Betsugū-Honden (別宮本殿), Edo period (1704)
- Betsugū-Heiden (別宮幣殿), Edo period (1704)
- Betsugū-Kairō (別宮廻廊), Edo period (1704)
- Betsugū-Mizugaki (別宮瑞垣), Edo period (1704)
- Betsugū-Haiden (別宮拝殿), Edo period (1704)
- Gate and Kairō (門及び廻廊), Edo period (1704)
- Zuishinmon (随身門), Edo period (1704)
- Torii (鳥居), Edo period (1663)
- Tachi sword (太刀 銘来国光 附:糸巻太刀拵), Kamakura period;
- Tachi sword (太刀 銘雲生 附:黒漆太刀拵), Kamakura period;

=== National Place of Scenic Beauty ===
- Magaki-ga-shima (籬が島), as a component part of the Landscape of Oku no Hosomichi

=== Miyagi Prefecture Tangible Cultural Properties ===
- *Tachi sword (伊達家歴代藩主奉納糸巻太刀), (Edo period)

=== Miyagi Prefecture Intangible Cultural Properties ===
- Masks (カマ神（竈神面）)

There is a bronze lantern in the precinct that is a (City-designated Cultural Property)

=== Natural Monuments ===
- Shiogama-zakura (Natural Monument)
- Ilex latifolia (Prefectural Natural Monument)
- Cryptomeria (City-designated Natural Monument)

== Festivals ==
A number of festivals are held throughout the year. The most important of these include:

- January 1: Hatsumōde
- February 3: Setsubun
- March 10: Hote Matsuri, originated by local townspeople in 1882 for the protection and prosperity of Shiogama city.
- April, 4th Sunday: Hana Matsuri, originated in 1778 to pray for protection of crops against flooding
- July 4–10: Rensai, the main festival of the shrine, during which salt is made from seawater, and yabusame mounted archery contests are held.

== See also ==
- Cultural Properties of Japan
- Modern system of ranked Shinto Shrines
- List of Places of Scenic Beauty of Japan (Miyagi)
