= The Miyagi Museum of Art =

Museum in Sendai, Miyagi Prefecture, Japan

- 宮城県美術館
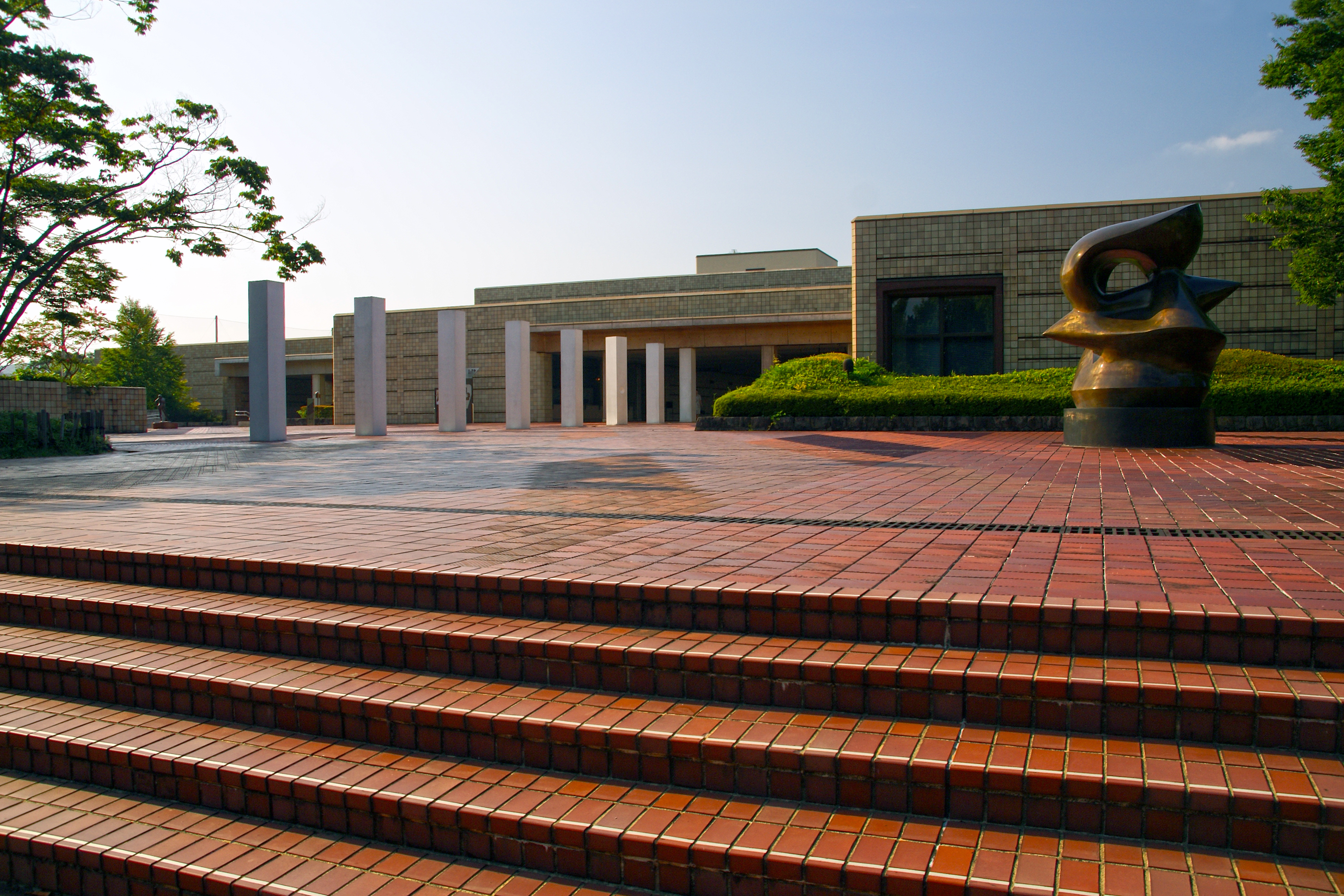
- Interactive map of the The Miyagi Museum of Art area

General information
- Location: 34-1 Kawauchi-Motohasekura, Aoba-ku, Sendai, Miyagi Prefecture, Japan
- Coordinates: 38°15′50″N 140°51′18″E
- Opened: November 1981

Website
- Official website

The Miyagi Museum of Art (宮城県美術館, Miyagi-ken bijutsukan) opened in Sendai, Japan, in 1981. The collection has as its primary focus works associated with Miyagi Prefecture and the Tōhoku region more generally, from the Meiji period to the present day, and also includes paintings by Wassily Kandinsky and Paul Klee. Artists represented include Aimitsu, Kishida Ryūsei, Matsumoto Shunsuke, Nakamura Tsune, Takahashi Yuichi, Yasui Sōtarō, and Yorozu Tetsugoro.

The building was designed by Kunio Maekawa.

== See also ==
- Sendai City Museum
- List of Cultural Properties of Japan - paintings (Miyagi)
