= List of cultural properties of Japan – paintings (Miyagi) =

This list is of paintings designated in the category of paintings (絵画, kaiga) for the Prefecture of Miyagi.

== National Cultural Properties ==
As of 1 July 2019, two properties have been designated Important Cultural Properties, being of national significance.

Property	Date	Municipality	Ownership	Comments	Image	Dimensions	Coordinates	Ref.
Partition paintings at Kanrantei 観瀾亭障壁画; Kanrantei shōhekiga	early C17	Matsushima	Kanrantei	21 panels, colours on gold ground; paper pasted on bamboo shōji (12), hinoki fusuma (6), and the hinoki walls of the tokonoma (3); the paintings include trees, rocks, waters, and spring flowers - dandelions, daffodils, azaleas, violets, and crab apples; attributed on stylistic grounds to Kanō Sakyō (狩野左京), a painter of the Kanō School in the employ of the Sendai Domain			38°22′10″N 141°03′41″E	
Partition paintings in the Zuigan-ji Hondō 本堂障壁画 hondō shōhekiga	1620-28	Matsushima	Zuigan-ji	161 panels, colours on gold ground; paintings of pines and peacocks in the Peacock Room (孔雀の間, kujaku-no-ma), of Lü Shang and King Wen in the Room of King Bun (文王の間, Bunnō-no-ma), of bamboo and plum trees, trees and flowers in the High Room and Highest Room (上段・上々段の間, jōdan-no-ma・jōjōdan-no-ma), of cherry trees in the Buddhist Room (仏間, Butsu-no-ma), of hawks and birds in the Hawk Room (鷹の間, taka-no-ma), of pines and cherry trees in the Pine Room (松の間, matsu-no-ma), and of chrysanthemums in the Chrysanthemum Room (菊の間, kiku-no-ma); the paintings are attributed to Hasegawa Tōhaku, Kanō Sakyō (狩野左京), and his pupil Kurota (九郎太); the designation includes twenty-two panels by Kibi Kōeki (吉備幸益) in the Hermit Ink Painting Room (仙人墨絵間, sennin sumie-no-ma) and twelve painted cedar doors; the paintings, dated by an ink inscription of 1730, have now been replaced with replicas and are stored in the temple museum		various sizes	38°22′20″N 141°03′35″E	

== Prefectural Cultural Properties ==
As of 1 May 2019, fourteen properties have been designated at a prefectural level.

Property	Date	Municipality	Ownership	Comments	Image	Dimensions	Coordinates	Ref.
Buddha's Parinirvāṇa 仏涅槃図; Butsu nehan-zu	Muromachi period	Kesennuma	Hōsen-ji (峰仙寺)	colours on silk; showing the parinirvana of Shaka, the historical Buddha, underneath the sal tree, surrounded by mourners man and beast, high and low; the painting was brought from Kyōto in 1539 and since the Keichō era (1596–1615) has been remounted four times		189.7 centimetres (6 ft 2.7 in) by 150.3 centimetres (4 ft 11.2 in)	38°47′38″N 141°30′24″E	
Mandala of the Two Realms, colour on silk 絹本着色両界曼茶羅図 kenpon chakushoku ryōkai mandara-zu	1385	Shibata	Daikō-in (大光院)	colours on silk; remounted in 1502 and 1734		Diamond Realm Mandala: 157.9 centimetres (5 ft 2.2 in) by 129.7 centimetres (4 ft 3.1 in); Womb Realm Mandala: 175.1 centimetres (5 ft 8.9 in) by 129.4 centimetres (4 ft 2.9 in)	38°04′05″N 140°45′55″E	
Godaidō at Matsushima 松島五大堂図; Matsushima Godaidō zu	c.1881	Sendai	The Miyagi Museum of Art	by Takahashi Yuichi (1828–1894); painted at the same time as his Before the Gate of the Miyagi Prefectural Office (1881); the first yōga or Western-style painting of this popular subject		108.6 centimetres (3 ft 6.8 in) by 57.7 centimetres (1 ft 10.7 in)	38°15′50″N 140°51′18″E	
Matsushima 松島図; Matsushima zu	c.1881	Sendai	The Miyagi Museum of Art	by Takahashi Yuichi (1828–1894); also painted at the same time as his Before the Gate of the Miyagi Prefectural Office (1881)		92.5 centimetres (3 ft 0.4 in) by 47.3 centimetres (1 ft 6.6 in)	38°15′50″N 140°51′18″E	
Before the Gate of the Miyagi Prefectural Office 宮城県庁門前図; Miyagi kenchō mon mae zu	1881	Sendai	The Miyagi Museum of Art	oil painting by Takahashi Yuichi (1828–1894); the building previously functioned as the Yōkendō (養賢堂) han school and was destroyed by fire in July 1945; the painting was commissioned by Miyagi Prefecture at the same time as two landscape paintings of Matsushima		122.0 centimetres (4 ft 0 in) by 61.1 centimetres (2 ft 0.1 in)	38°15′50″N 140°51′18″E	
Seikai Mandala 清海曼茶羅図; Seikai mandala zu	Muromachi period	Sendai	Jōkaku-ji (成覚寺)	the Seikai Mandala, along with the Taima Mandala and the Chikō Mandala, is one of the three Pure Land Mandalas (浄土三曼荼羅, jōdo sanmandara); based on the Amitayurdhyana Sutra, it depicts a vision of the Pure Land granted to the monk Seikai (清海) in 996; the painting was brought from Hōrin-ji (法林寺) in Kyōto in 1630		183 centimetres (6 ft 0 in) by 151 centimetres (4 ft 11 in)	38°15′18″N 140°53′21″E	
Sakyamunī with Sixteen Benevolent Deities 釈迦十六善神像図; Shaka jūroku zenjin zō zu	Muromachi period	Kesennuma	Hōsen-ji (峰仙寺)	colours on silk, with kirikane, gold paint, cinnabar, yellow ochre, ultramarine, verdigris, and black ink; the Sixteen Benevolent Deities, protectors of the Mahaprajnaparamita Sutra, appear eight on each side of Shaka and the attendant bodhisattvas Fugen Bosatsu and Monju Bosatsu; the painting was brought from Kyōto in 1539		126.1 centimetres (4 ft 1.6 in) by 61.4 centimetres (2 ft 0.2 in)	38°47′38″N 141°30′24″E	
Buddha's Parinirvāṇa 仏涅槃図; Butsu nehan zu	Muromachi period	Matsushima	Zuigan-ji	colours on silk; traditionally attributed by the temple to Kanō Motonobu		227 centimetres (7 ft 5 in) by 183 centimetres (6 ft 0 in)	38°22′20″N 141°03′35″E	
Sakyamunī Preaching 釈迦説法図; Shaka seppō zu	Muromachi period	Matsushima	Zuigan-ji	colours on silk		159.8 centimetres (5 ft 2.9 in) by 113 centimetres (3 ft 8 in)	38°22′20″N 141°03′35″E	
Shōsai Hōshin 性西法身像; Shōsai Hōshin zō	late Kamakura or early Muromachi period	Matsushima	Zuigan-ji	colours on silk; refounder of the Heian-period temple of Enpukuzen-ji (円福禅寺) as Zuigan-ji		101 centimetres (3 ft 4 in) by 49.5 centimetres (1 ft 7.5 in)	38°22′20″N 141°03′35″E	
Rankei Dōryū 蘭渓道隆像; Rankei Dōryū zō	late Kamakura or early Muromachi period	Matsushima	Zuigan-ji	colours on silk; second chief priest of Zuigan-ji		101 centimetres (3 ft 4 in) by 49.5 centimetres (1 ft 7.5 in)	38°22′20″N 141°03′35″E	
Minki Sōgu 明極聰愚像; Minki Sōgu zō	late Kamakura or early Muromachi period	Matsushima	Zuigan-ji	colours on silk; tenth chief priest of Zuigan-ji		93.5 centimetres (3 ft 0.8 in) by 45.3 centimetres (1 ft 5.8 in)	38°22′20″N 141°03′35″E	
Partition painting of phoenixes from the Honmaru great hall of Sendai Castle 仙台城本丸大広間障壁画鳳凰図; Sendai-jō honmaru dai-hiroma shōhekiga hōō zu	Momoyama period	Matsushima	Matsushima Town (kept at the Kanrantei Matsushima Museum)	colours on paper with gold ground; by an artist of the Kanō school for Date Masamune		3.19 metres (10 ft 6 in) by 1.606 metres (5 ft 3.2 in)	38°22′52″N 141°04′08″E	
Partition painting of fans from the Honmaru great hall of Sendai Castle 仙台城本丸大広間障壁画鳳凰図; Sendai-jō honmaru dai-hiroma shōhekiga senmen zu	Momoyama period	Sendai	Sendai City Museum	colours on paper; the fans depict subjects including a bridge and waterwheel, Musashino (武蔵野), Hamamatsu, wisteria with running water, and phoenixes with paulownias; few partition paintings survive from castles, so these are of particular significance		3.30 metres (10 ft 10 in) by 1.585 metres (5 ft 2.4 in)	38°15′21″N 140°51′24″E	

== Municipal Cultural Properties ==
Properties designated at a municipal level include:

Property	Date	Municipality	Ownership	Comments	Image	Dimensions	Coordinates	Ref.
True View of Matsushima 松島真景図; Matsushima shinkeizu		Matsushima		by Tani Bunchō				
Date Mitsumune 伊達光宗像; Date Mitsumune zō		Matsushima	Zuigan-ji	colour on silk		123.0 centimetres (4 ft 0.4 in) by 55.9 centimetres (1 ft 10.0 in)	38°22′20″N 141°03′35″E	
Tenrin'in Irohahime 天麟院五郎八姫像; Tenrin'in Irohahime zō	early Edo period	Matsushima	Zuigan-ji	colour on paper		107.0 centimetres (3 ft 6.1 in) by 50.4 centimetres (1 ft 7.8 in)	38°22′20″N 141°03′35″E	
Date Masamune, colour on paper, by Kanō Tan'yū 紙本著色伊達政宗画像(狩野探幽筆) shihon chakushoku Date Masamune gazō (Kanō Tan'yū-hitsu)		Sendai	Sendai City Museum				38°15′22″N 140°51′24″E	
Byōbu with Waka and Chrysanthemums 菊絵和歌屏風 kiku-e waka byōbu		Sendai	Sendai City Museum				38°15′22″N 140°51′24″E	
Byōbu with Blossom Viewing at Kasumigaoka 躑躅ヶ岡花見図屏風; Kasumigaoka hanami zu byōbu		Sendai	Sendai City Museum				38°15′22″N 140°51′24″E	
Partition paintings from the Former Honmaru and Ninomaru Palace at Sendai Castle 仙台城旧本丸及び二ノ丸御殿障壁画; Sendai-jō kyū-Honmaru oyobi Ninomaru Goten shōhekiga		Sendai	Sendai City Museum	designation comprises a pair of two-panel Byōbu with Mallows (紙本著色葵図), six panels of Flowers and Trees, on paper with gold ground (紙本金地著色花木図), and four panels of Pheasant in a Pine Tree, colour on paper with gold ground (紙本金地著色松に山鳥図) by Azuma Tōyō (東東洋)			38°15′22″N 140°51′24″E	
Portraits of the Successive Generations of Lords and Ladies of the Sendai Domain 仙台藩歴代藩主及夫人肖像画; Sendai-han rekidai han-shu fujin shōzōga		Sendai	Sendai City Museum	series of 31 scrolls and 2 panels (Date Masamune pictured)			38°15′22″N 140°51′24″E	
Rei Shōjo, Peonies, Confederate Rose, by Date Tsunamune 絹本著色霊昭女.牡丹.芙蓉図(伊達綱宗筆) kenpon chakushoku Rei Shōjo・botan・fuyō zu (Date Tsunamune hitsu)		Sendai	Sendai City Museum	three scrolls			38°15′22″N 140°51′24″E	
Our Lady of Sorrows, oil on copper plate 銅板油彩悲しみのマリア像 dōban yusai kanashimi no Maria zō		Sendai	Sendai City Museum				38°15′22″N 140°51′24″E	
Eight Views of Xiaoxiang, by Sesson Shūkei 瀟湘八景図(雪村周継筆); Shōshō hakkei (Sesson Shūkei hitsu)		Sendai	Sendai City Museum	six scrolls			38°15′22″N 140°51′24″E	
True View of Mount Dainenji, attributed to Takaku Aigai 大年寺山真景図(伝高久靄厓筆); Dainenji-yama shinkei zu (den-Takaku Aigai hitsu)		Sendai	Sendai City Museum				38°15′22″N 140°51′24″E	

== See also ==
- Cultural Properties of Japan
- List of National Treasures of Japan (paintings)
- Japanese painting
- List of Historic Sites of Japan (Miyagi)
- List of Cultural Properties of Japan - historical materials (Miyagi)
- Tōhoku History Museum
