= Mitamaya =

Altar used in Shinto-style ancestor worship

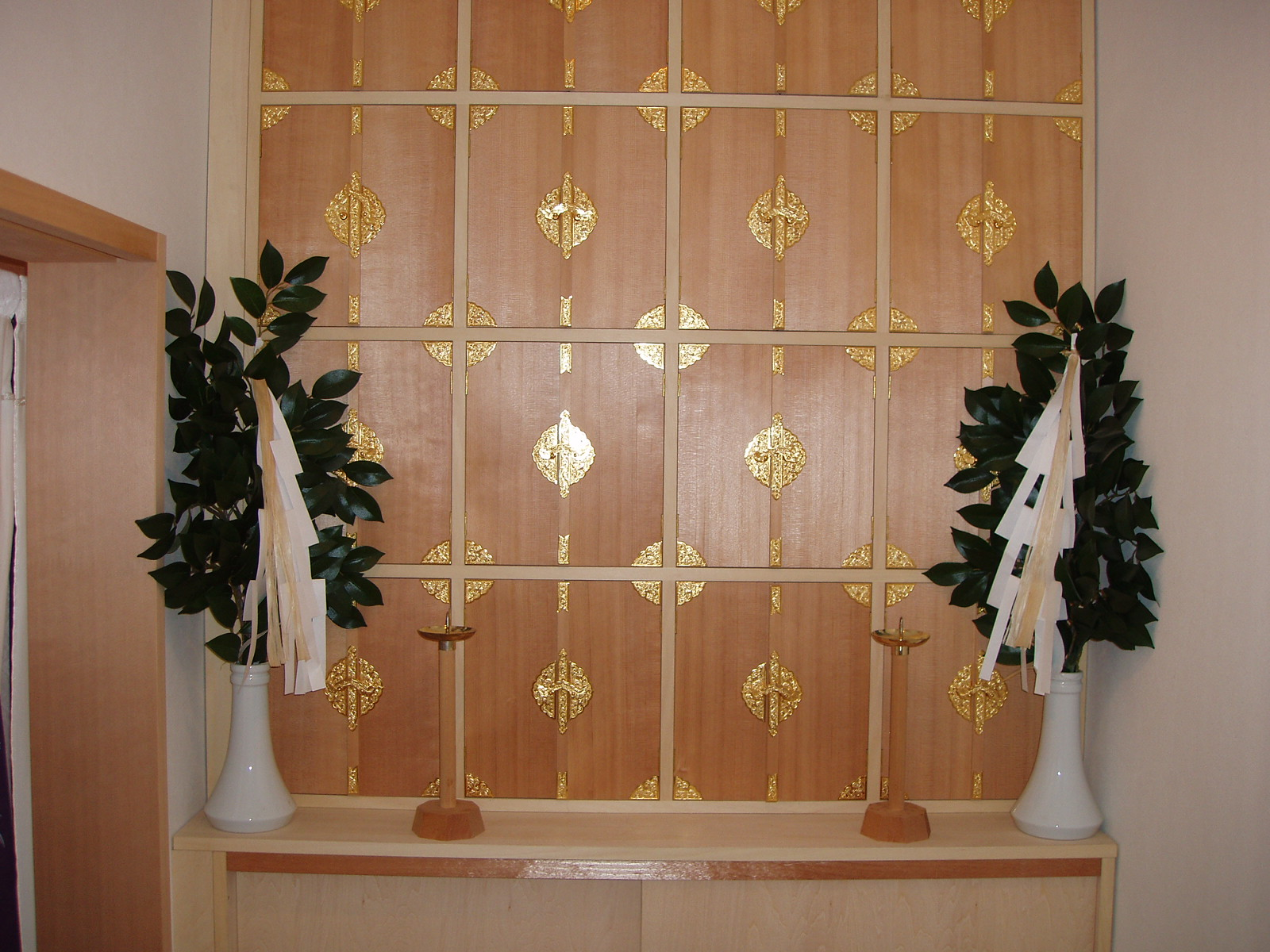
A mitamaya

A mitamaya (御霊屋; literally mitama "soul [of the dead]" + ya "house"; also called, otamaya, tamaya, or soreisha 祖霊社, or "Reibyo" 霊廟) is an altar used in Shinto-style ancestor worship, dedicated in the memory of deceased forebears. It generally has a mirror symbolizing the spirits of the deceased or a tablet bearing their names and is used not only to enshrine blood relatives, but also to honor respected non-family members.

Since Buddhist funeral rites dominate in Japanese religious practice, mitamaya are found less often in Japanese houses than their Buddhist counterpart, the butsudan. Their value are also below that of the more highly respected kamidana.

== Ritual ==
The mitamaya is placed in an inner chamber, on a shelf, the mitama-san-no-tana, attached to the wall about six feet high. It is placed lower than the kamidana.

Rites are performed for the mitamaya every tenth day up to the fiftieth, and thereafter on the one-hundredth day and one-year anniversary. The one-year ritual is followed by another which marks the spirit's joining of the ancestors at the family shrine.

== History ==
In ancient times, people held domestic rites called Kinen-sai in the February or April and Niinamesai in November. During these rites, people worshiped their ancestors, the god of food, and the hearth deity. They believed the spirits of their ancestors (Oyagami) came to them through the rice.

During the Heian period cults of Goryō developed and people changed to honoring the dead in July for Urabon-e, and in January.

During the medieval period, people started to enshrine the spirits of dead individuals, like Retired Emperor Gotoba (1180–1239) whose memory was kept through memorial tablets. In the early modern period, there was a rise in "Shinto funerals" (shinsōsai) where people were treated like kami. The Yoshida clan gave spirit ranks like Myōjin-gō, Reisha-gō, and Reijin-gō to the dead, who were sometimes worshipped at shrines.

The spread of Kokugaku led to an increased interest in Miyamaya, and more people enshrined their ancestors in their homes.

The first modern mitamaya was built in 1599 in the Toyokuni Shrine in Kyoto for Toyotomi Hideyoshi. Screen paintings and its ruins suggest that it was modeled after the Kitano Tenman-gū. It was later destroyed by the Tokugawa.

Later the mitamaya was generally established for Japanese nobles, military heroes, and other people with high reputation. This practice spread in the Edo period. During the Kokugaku movement it became more common to erect mitamaya in ordinary homes. It formed a central part of the Shinto funeral rituals (神葬祭, shinsōsai).
