= Sendai Tōshōgū =

Memorial shrine of Tokugawa Ieyasu in Sendai, Japan

Sendai Tōshōgū 仙台東照宮
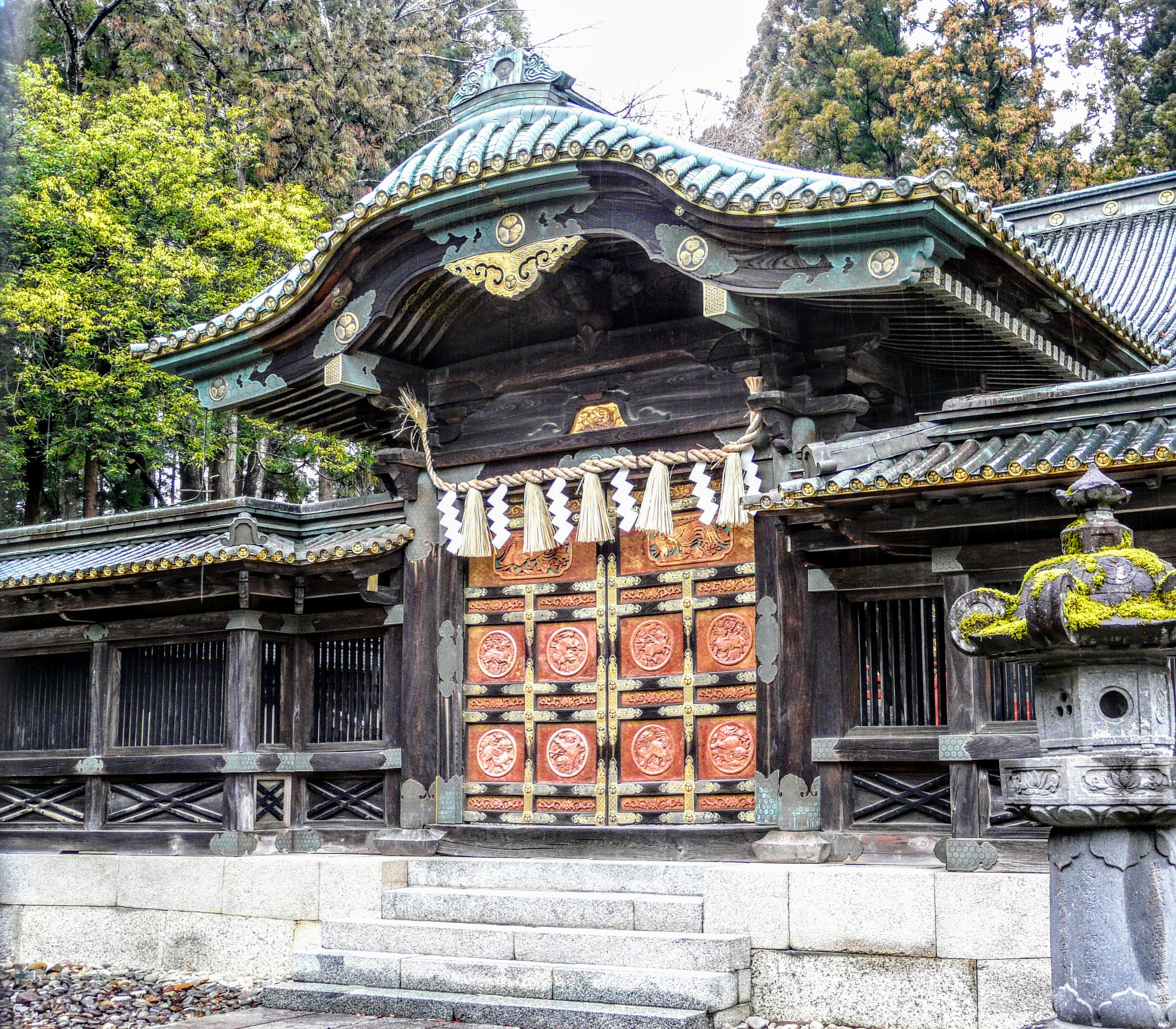
- Gate of Main Sanctuary

- Location within Miyagi Prefecture Location within Japan

Religion
- Affiliation: Shinto
- Deity: Tokugawa Ieyasu
- Festival: April 14
- Type: Tōshō-gū

Location
- Location: 1-6-1 Tōshōgū, Aoba-ku, Sendai, Miyagi
- Coordinates: 38°16′49″N 140°53′06″E

Architecture
- Style: Irimoya-zukuri
- Founder: Date Tadamune
- Established: 1654

Website
- www.sendai-toshogu.or.jp

Sendai Tōshōgū (仙台東照宮) is the memorial shrine of Tokugawa Ieyasu in Sendai, Miyagi Prefecture, Japan. Five of its buildings, all dating to 1654, have been designated Important Cultural Properties. The torii and gates were damaged in the 2011 Tōhoku earthquake and tsunami.

== History ==
The Sendai Tōshōgū was established by Date Tadamune, the second daimyō of Sendai Domain. Construction began in August 1649, and was completed in March 1654. The shrine served as the tutelary temple of the Date clan during the Edo period. However, with the fall of the Tokugawa shogunate in 1868, the new Meiji government initially closed the shrine. It was soon re-opened due to demands of local townspeople, and under the State Shinto system of shrine ranking from 1879 through 1916, was officially designated as a "county shrine" and from 1916 to 1946 as a "prefectural shrine".

== Notable structures ==
- Honden (本殿) (1654) (Important Cultural Property)
- Karamon (唐門) (1654) (ICP)
- Sukibei (fence) (透塀) (1654) (ICP)
- Zuijinmon (随神門) (1654) (ICP)
- Torii (鳥居) (1654) (ICP)
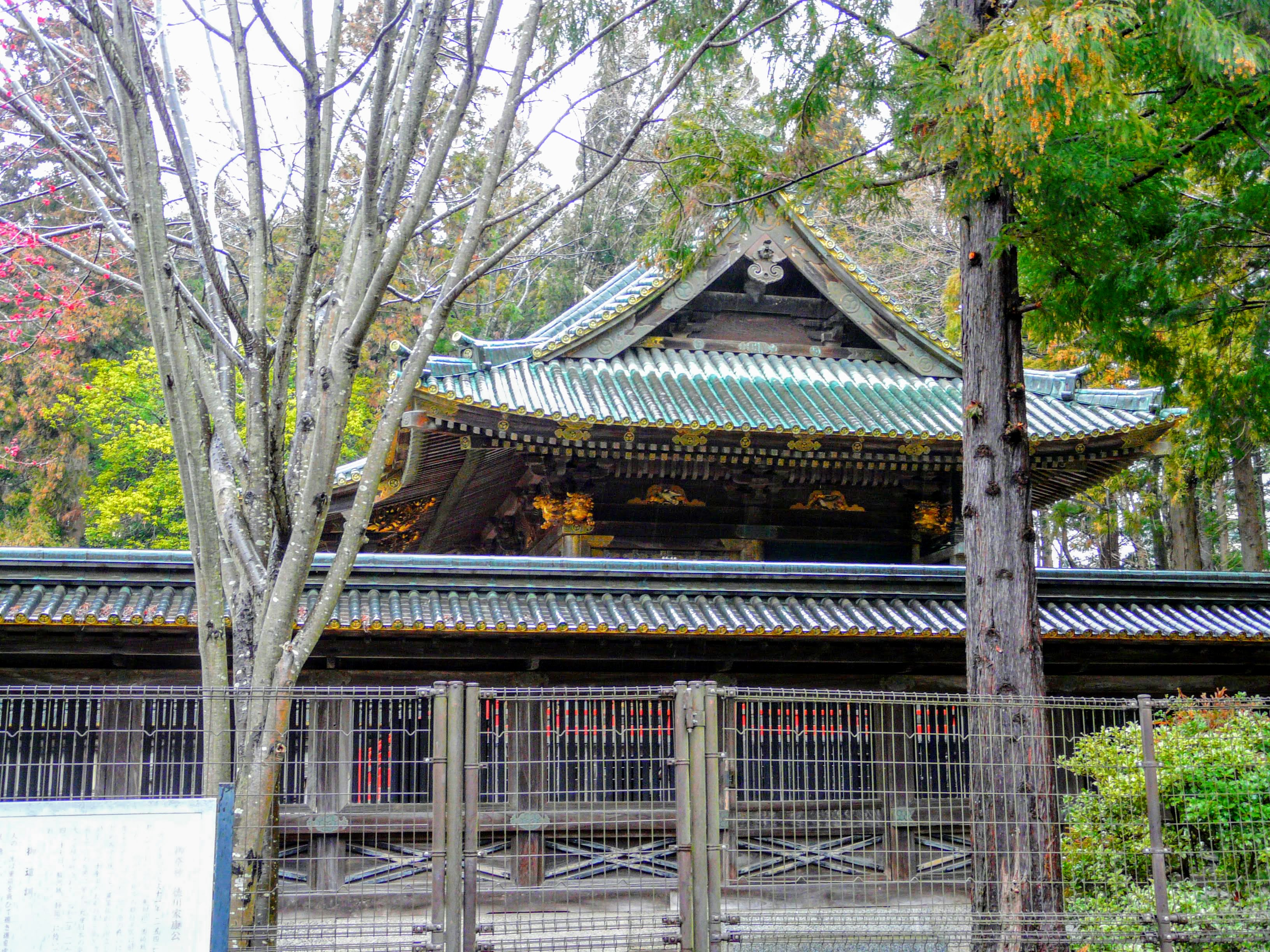
Honden

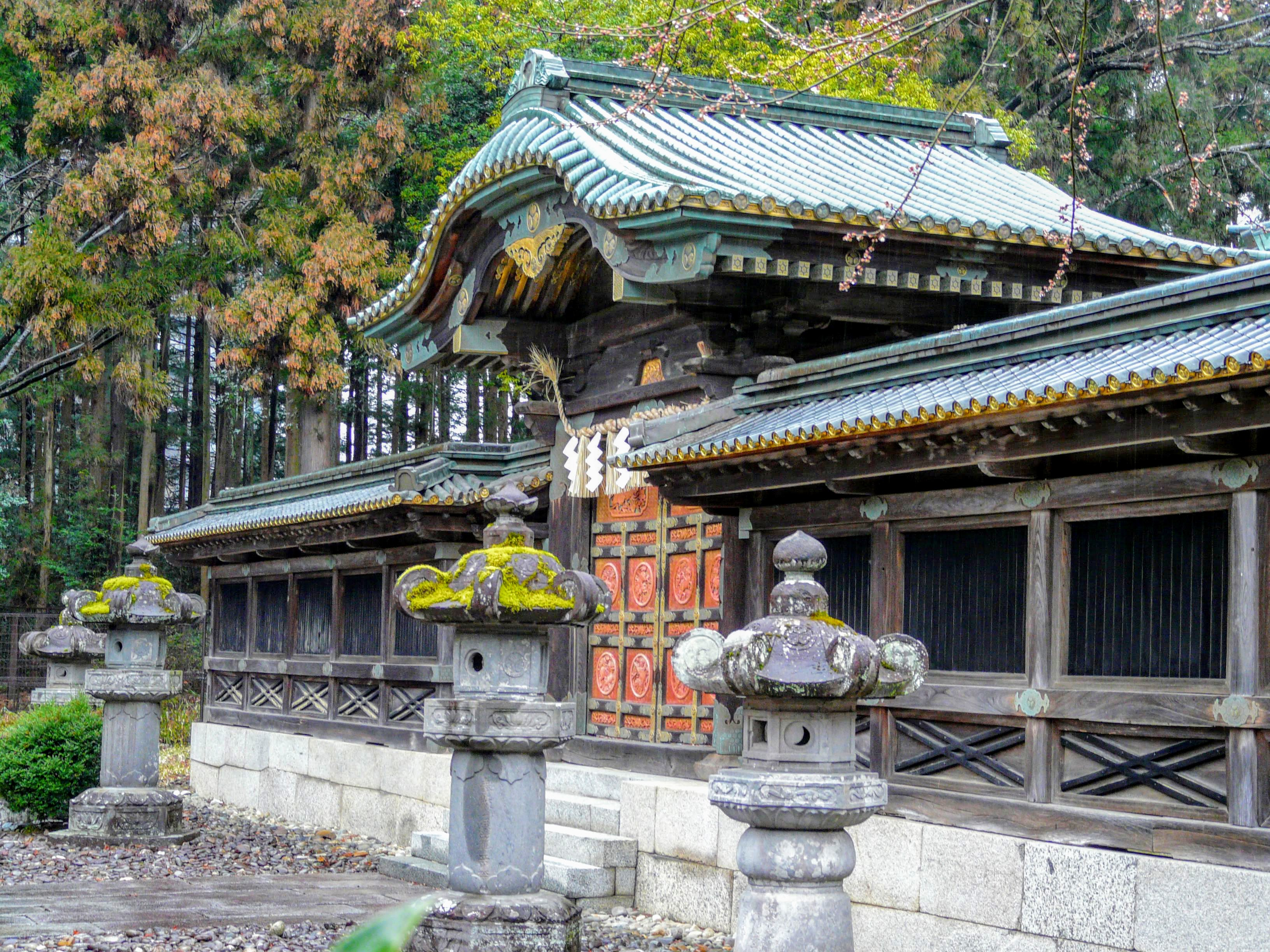
Karamon and Sukibei

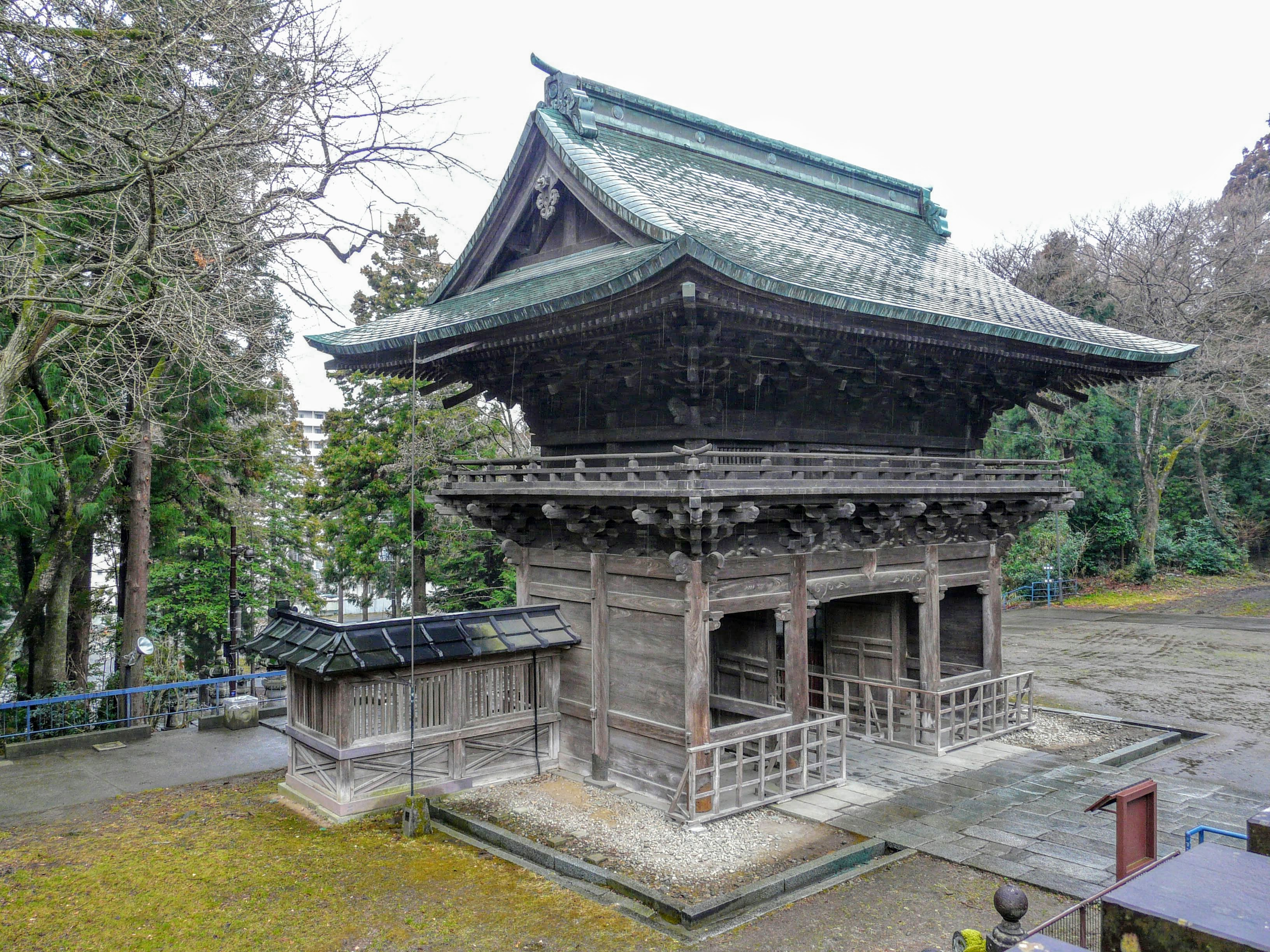
Zuijinmon

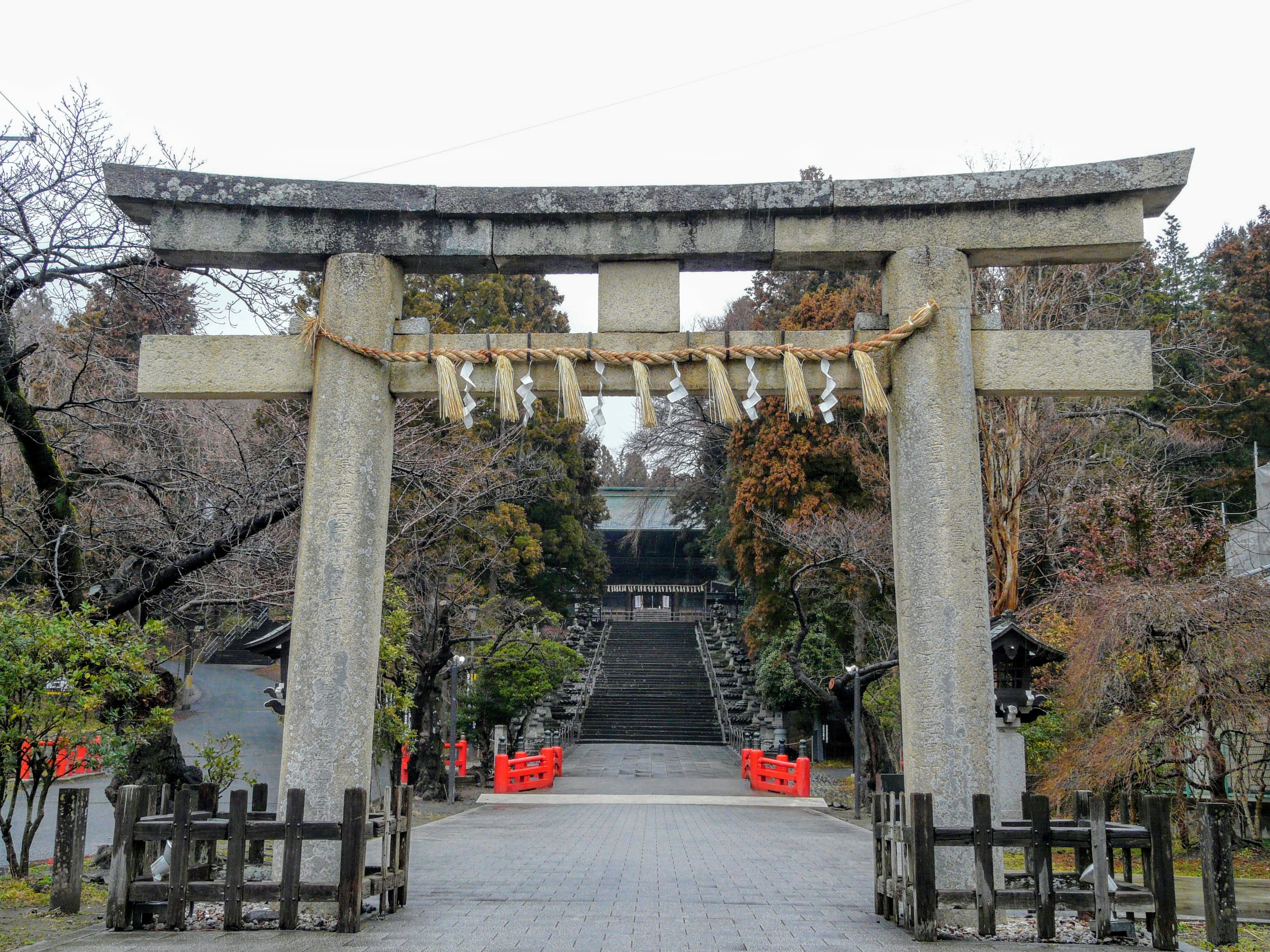
Torii

== See also ==
- Tōshō-gū
- List of Tōshō-gū
- Nikkō Tōshōgū
- Zuihōden
- Entsū-in
- List of Shinto shrines
