= Ōsaki Hachimangū =

Shinto shrine in Aoba-ku, Sendai, Miyagi, Japan

Ōsaki Hachimangū 大崎八幡宮
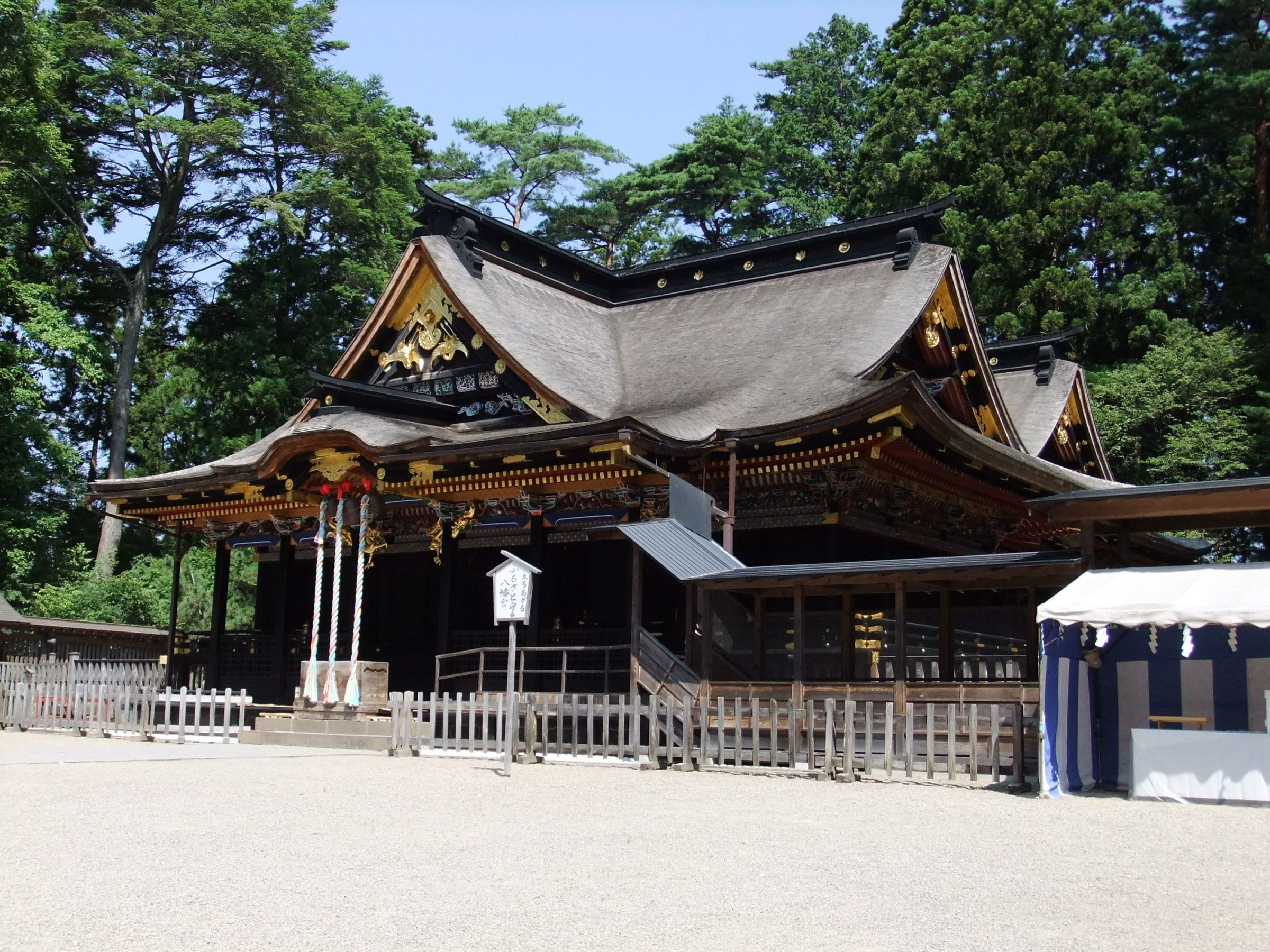
- Haiden of Ōsaki Hachimangū

- Ōsaki Hachimangū Ōsaki Hachimangū (Japan)

Religion
- Affiliation: Shinto
- Festival: September 14–17
- Type: Hachiman

Location
- Location: 4-6-1 Hachiman, Aoba-ku, Sendai-shi, Miyagi-ken
- Interactive map of Ōsaki Hachimangū 大崎八幡宮
- Coordinates: 38.2722°N 140.845°E

Website
- www.okos.co.jp/oosaki/

Ōsaki Hachimangū (大崎八幡宮) is a Shinto shrine located in Aoba-ku, Sendai, Miyagi, Japan. The main shrine building (社殿, shaden) has been designated a National Treasure of Japan.

== Enshrined kami ==
The kami enshrined at Ōsaki Hachimangū are:

- Emperor Ōjin (石凝姥命), Emperor Chūai (仲哀天皇) and Empress Jingū (神功皇后), who collectively form the kami Hachiman.

== History ==
The founding date of the shrine is unknown, but according to shrine legend, Sakanoue no Tamuramaro enshrined a bunrei of Usa Shrine at Isawa Castle (present-day Mizusawa, Ōshū, Iwate) and called it "Chinjufu Hachimangū". During the Muromachi period, the Ōsaki clan, who held the position of kanrei of Ōshū, moved the shrine to their own territory (present-day Tajiri-chō, Ōsaki, Miyagi), and it came to be called Ōsaki Hachimangū. In 1604, after the Ōsaki clan was abolished, Date Masamune began construction of the shrine at its current location, northwest of Sendai Castle and at the northwest end of the jōkamachi castle town of Sendai Castle. The site is located west of the shrine's Jingū-ji temple, Ryūhō-ji. Masamune hired craftsmen from Kyoto and central Japan, some of whom had previously worked for the Toyotomi family. The shrine was erected between 1604 and 1607. The lavish decoration with wood carving, painting, metal fittings, and lacquer emulated recent models from central Japan, in particular, the Toyokuni shrine in Kyoto.

Under Shinbutsu-shūgō, the syncretism of Shinto and Buddhism, and as part of the belief in the guardian deities of the Chinese zodiac, which became popular in Sendai during the Edo period, Amida Nyorai was regarded as the avatar of Hachiman. and was believed to protect against drought. The shrine remains revered today by people born in the years of the dog and boar. The shrine's yabusame ritual, previously performed by vassals of the Ōsaki clan, was performed by three of these former vassals who traveled to Sendai on festival day at the expense of Sendai Domain. Although the shrine was also called "Hachiman-do" by commoners, with the Meiji period's separation of Shinto from Buddhism, it reverted to its traditional name of "Ōsaki Hachiman Jinja." With the establishment of the Modern system of ranked Shinto shrines in 1871, it was designed as only a village shrine (村社). In 1997, ten years before the 400th anniversary of the shrine's founding, the name was changed to Ōsaki Hachimangū.

The shrine is a 12-minute walk from Tōhokufukushidaimae Station, or a 15-minute walk from Kunimi Station, both on the JR East Senzan Line

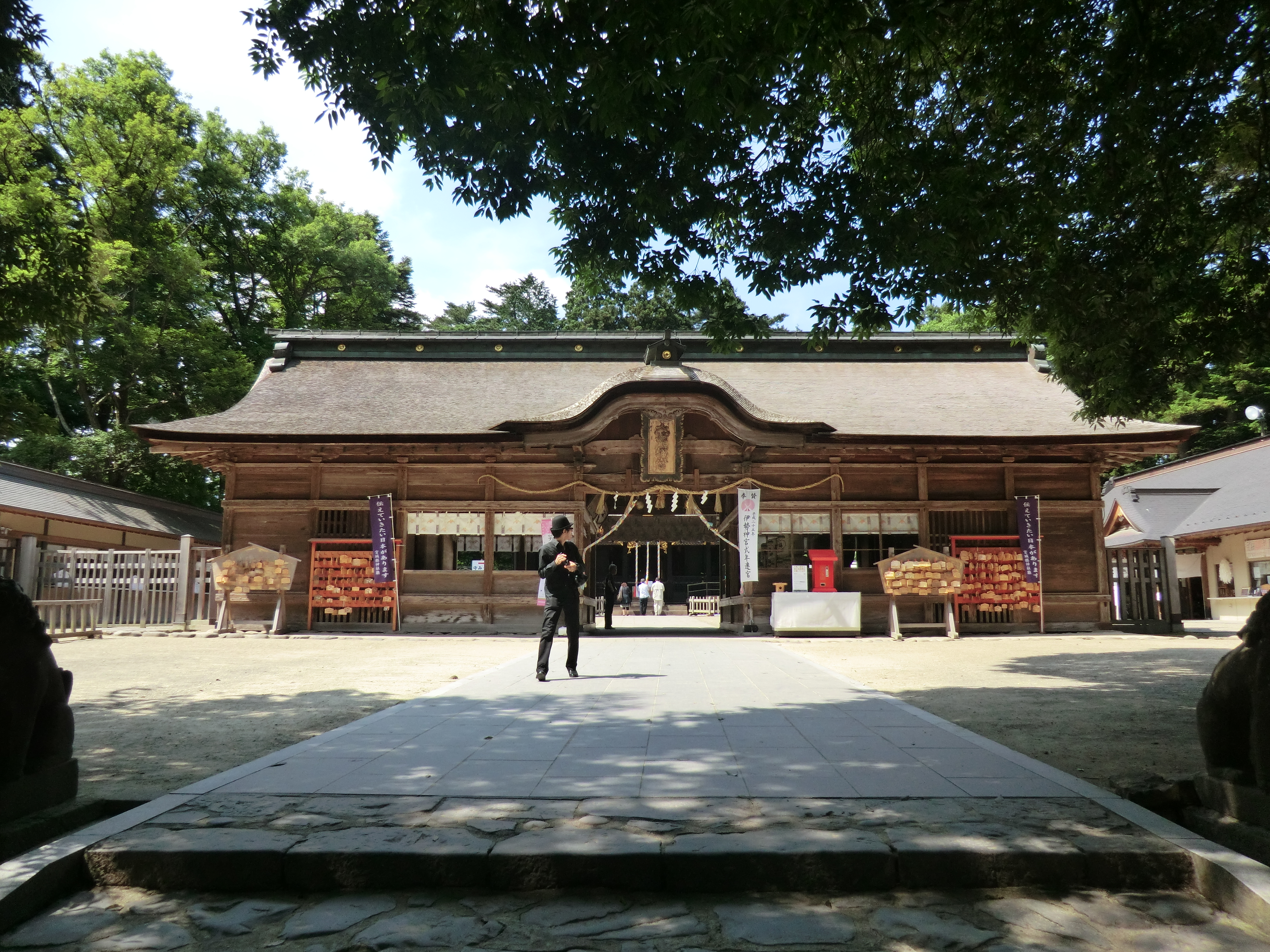
Nagatoko

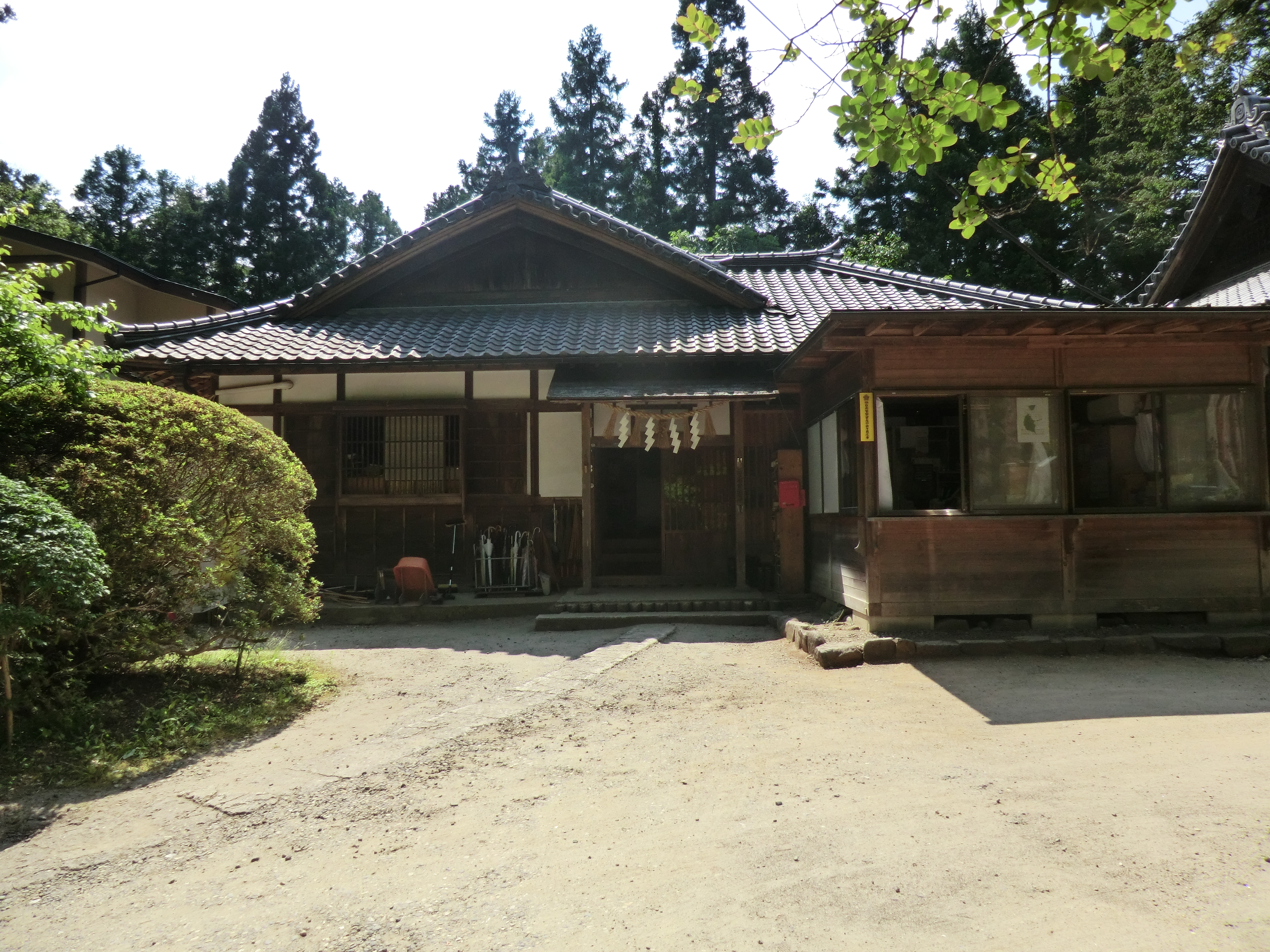
Former priest's residence

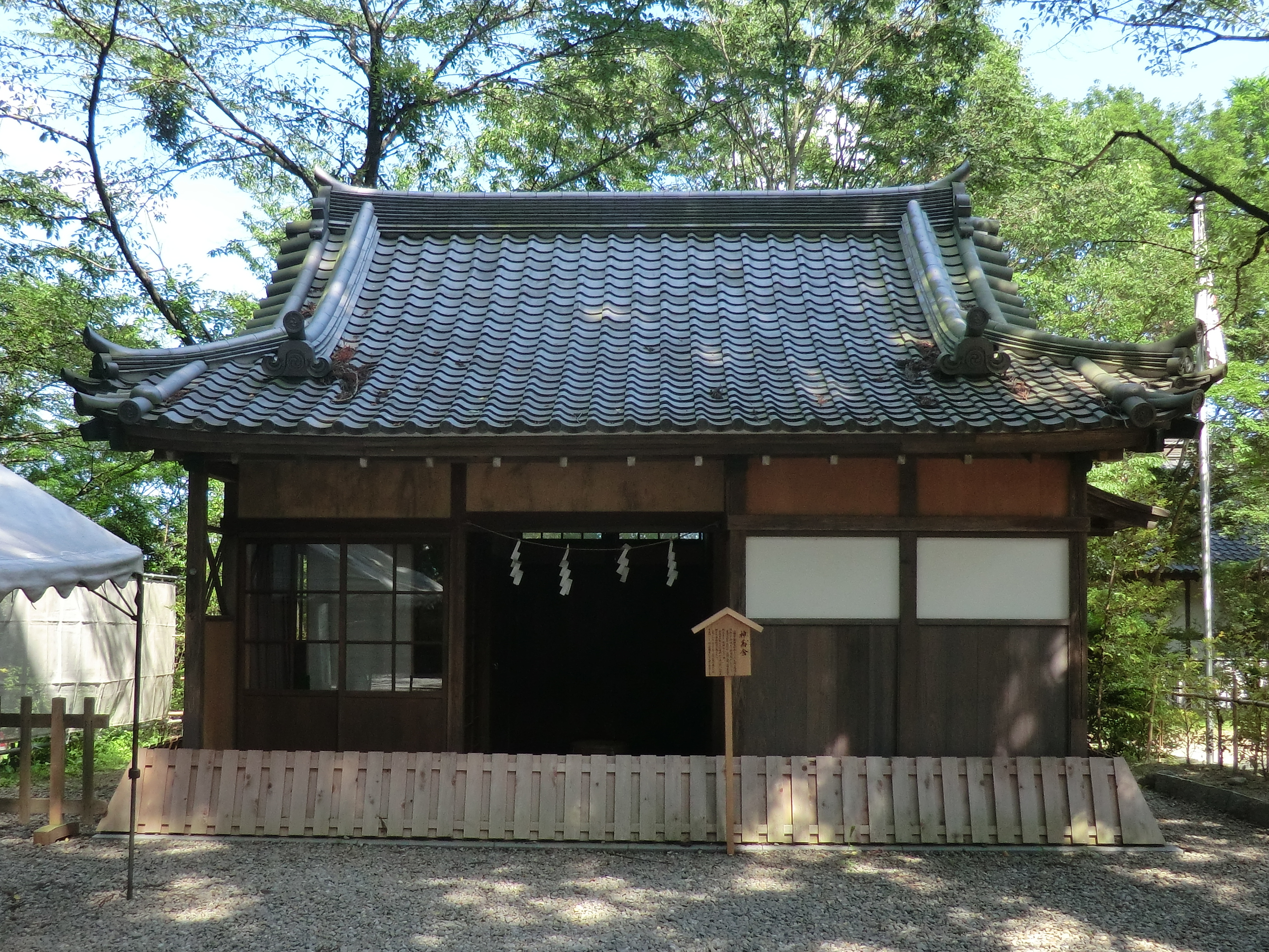
Shinmeisha stables

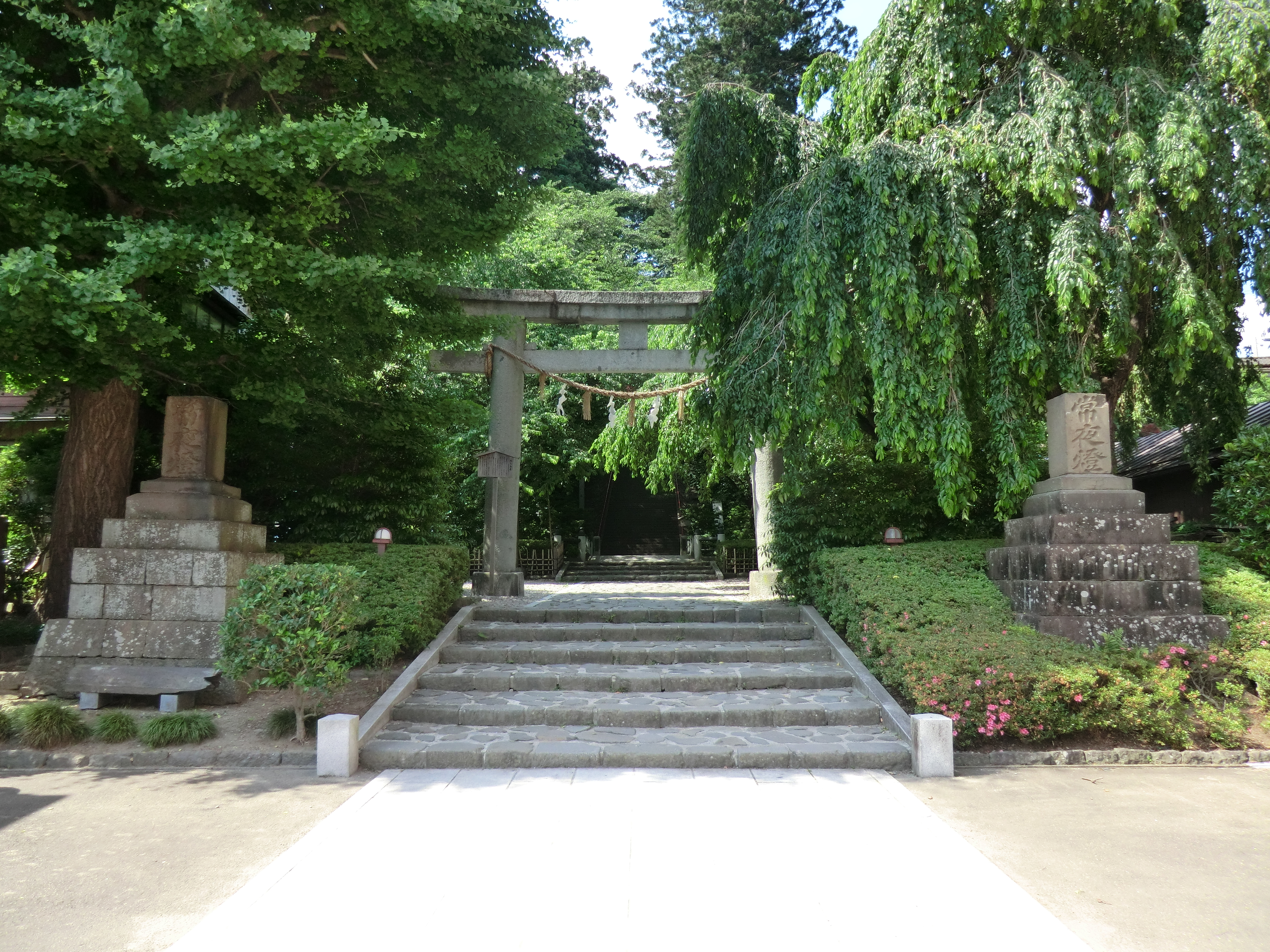
Stone Torii（Miyagi Prefecture Tangible Cultural Property）

== Cultural properties ==
=== National Treasures ===
- Ōsaki Hachimangū Honden, Ishi-no-ma, Heiden (大崎八幡宮本殿、石の間、拝殿), Edo period (1607);

=== Important Cultural Properties ===
- Ōsaki Hachimangū Nagatoko (大崎八幡宮長床), Edo period (1661-1672);

=== Intangible Cultural Properties ===
- Ōsaki Hachiman Jinja Kagura (大崎八幡神社の能神楽), Edo period; This performing art is a type of Hōin Kagura, with a tranquil, Noh-like style. It is performed annually on September 14 on the nagatoko (long platform) in front of the worship hall. According to records, there were 17 dances; however, only eight remain today. Originally, Kagura was performed by ten shrine priests, but it is now performed by parishioners.

=== National Registered Tangible Cultural Properties ===
- Ōsaki Hachimangū Shrine Office (大崎八幡宮社務所), late Taishō period; This building is on the west side of the approach, facing east. The main building is in irimoya style with a hipped roof to the west and an irimoya style entrance hall to the east. It is tiled. The main room and annex, each with a tokonoma, are arranged north and south, and a VIP room is attached to the west of the main room. The VIP room is equipped with a tokonoma, staggered shelves and attached shoin.
- Ōsaki Hachimangū Priest's Residence (大崎八幡宮旧宮司宿舎), Taishō period; This building is connected to the south of the shrine office via a corridor. A hipped roof is attached to the north side of the main building, which is an irimoya-style east-west wing. The roof is tiled. Four rooms are arranged in a square shape, with the shrine office, which is fitted with a tokonoma, protruding on the north side. The gable of the main building, which has the same gentle rise as the shrine office entrance, is visible from the front,.
- Ōsaki Hachimangū Shinmesha (大崎八幡宮神馬舎), Taishō period; This stable stands to the east of the shrine office, across the approach to the shrine. It is an irimoya-style building with a shingled roof, and the west side has a gabled roof that extends down. The upper floor is located to the north, and two stables are located to the east and south, with a dirt floor to the west and a protruding storage shed.

== Architecture ==
The shaden is one of the oldest extant examples of ishi-no-ma-zukuri (石の間造), also known as gongen-zukuri (権現造), and an outstanding work of Azuchi–Momoyama architecture. It is a single-storied structure consisting of a main sanctuary (honden) and a worship hall (haiden) which are joined via a connecting passage called ishi-no-ma. All three structures are under a single roof which is covered with thin shake shingles (kokerabuki 柿葺) made from Japanese cypress.

The honden is a 5 ken (間, bay) by 3 bay structure with a hip-and-gable, irimoya style roof to which a simple gabled roof of the 3 ken by 1 ken ishi-no-ma connects. The haiden is also 3 ken deep and 7 ken wide. Its roof is like that of the honden of the hip-and-gable type. On the front it has an attached triangular dormer with a decorative bargeboard of strongly concave shape, a chidori hafu (千鳥破風, lit. "plover gable"). The entrance is covered by a 5 ken wide step canopy with an undulating karahafu gable at eave ends (nokikarahafu).

== See also ==
- List of National Treasures of Japan (shrines)
