= Zuijin =

Kami warrior-guardians

In Shinto, Zuijin (随身; lit. "Obeying-Orders Being" or "Attendant Deity") are Kami warrior-guardian figures, Kami that guard over shrine gates are considered to be Kado-Mori-no-Kami or Kadomori-no-Kami, the gods who watch over the gates. They're often depicted as holding bows and arrows or wearing three silver rings. It appears on glass-like materials. The name was originally applied to the bodyguards of the Emperor of Japan. Statues of Zuijin are now often placed flanking shrine gates, similar to the Niō and Gozu and Mezu. The Zuijin are also associated with Dosojin, protector of crossroads and other boundary areas.

== History ==
Zuijin (also called zuishin) was a government official in Konoefu (近衛府, the Headquarters of the Inner Palace Guards) during and after the Heian period; zuijin followed nobles to guard them when they went out.

== Yadaijin ==
Yadaijin is one of the two deity statues in Zuijin (Imperial guards during the Heian period) costumes that are placed at the both sides of Zuijin-mon gate, holding bows and arrows on the observer's left. Kadomori, a guardian deity at the shrine gate. He is dressed in Kettekino-ho (open sleeve seams outer robe), putting on Kenei no kanmuri (headdress) with Oikake (accessories for the headdress), wearing a sword, holding bows and arrows. He is called Yadaijin (Minister with arrows) after his arrows, and Zuijin-mon gate is sometimes called Yadaijin-mon gate. However, he is not a Daijin (minister) but a Zuijin (attendant) called Kadono-osa (public officer).

Also, he is referred as Amanoiwatowake no Kami (one of the deities from Japanese mythology). Or it is said that the image of Yadaijin comes from Amenooshihi no Mikoto and Amatsukume no Mikoto in the lead, removing Amenoiwahagi (big rocks), holding Kabutsuchi-no-tachi (the ancient sword), 天波十弓 (bows), and 天真児矢 (arrows) at the time of Tensonkorin (the descent to earth of the grandson of the sun goddess).

== Sadajin ==
On the right of the observer is Sadajin (左大臣), the elder left hand man. His attire is similar to Yadajin’s, with the same Kenei no kanmuri (headdress), Oikake (accessories for the headdress), and weapons, including a large bow and arrows.

The main difference between the two guardian deity statues is that Sadajin’s mouth is open, while Yadajin’s is closed. This is meant to symbolize the first breath in and the first breath out, a concept borrowed from Budhhist traditions.

== See also ==
- Dogū
- Haniwa
- Hōko (doll)
- Shikigami
- Terracotta Army
- Totem
