= 2003 Zhaosu earthquake =

Earthquake near the China-Kazakhstan border

- Location within Kazakhstan
- UTC time: 2003-12-01 01:38:31
- ISC event: 7195925
- USGS-ANSS: ComCat
- Local date: 1 December 2003
- Local time: 06:38:31 Kazakhstan time (UTC+5); 09:38:31 CST (UTC+8)
- Magnitude: M_{s} 6.1; M_{w} 6.0
- Depth: 15 km (9.3 mi)
- Epicenter: 42.905°N 80.515°E
- Type: Reverse
- Areas affected: Raiymbek, Kazakhstan and Zhaosu, China
- Total damage: ¥100–500 million (US$14–70 million, equivalent to $32.6–122.7 million in 2005)
- Max. intensity: CSIS VIII (MMI IX)
- Aftershocks: 145 (as of 30/12/2003)
- Casualties: 11 dead, 73 injured

A M_{s} 6.1 earthquake struck the China–Kazakhstan border region on 1 December 2003 at 01:38 UTC. The epicenter was located in Raiymbek District, Almaty Region, Kazakhstan, just 2 km (1.2 mi) from the border with Zhaosu County, Xinjiang, China.

== Tectonic setting ==
The Tien Shan mountains in Central Asia formed as a result of thrusting and folding of the continental crust during the Late Cenozoic era. Around this time, the Indian subcontinent is colliding with Asia along a 2,500 km long convergent boundary known as the Main Himalayan Thrust. The ongoing collision of India into the Eurasian plate has resulted in extreme internal deformation of the continental crust. Deformation has induced large-scale intraplate shear and thrust faulting far from the plate boundary. Thrusting along the Tien Shan mountains has shortened the crust by an average velocity of 13 ± 7 mm/yr. In some areas such as the Western Tien Shan, the shortening rate is as high as 23 mm/yr, however in the northern region, that rate is much slower at just 6 mm/yr.

== Earthquake ==
The United States Geological Survey (USGS) and International Seismological Centre (ISC) both reported a moment magnitude (M_{w}) of 6.0, while the China Earthquake Administration put the magnitude at M_{s} 6.1. The ISC reported a depth of 15 km (9.3 mi). The earthquake occurred on a reverse fault. By 30 December, 145 aftershocks were recorded, including two exceeding M_{L} 5.0.

The earthquake had a maximum observed intensity of IX (Violent) on the Modified Mercalli intensity scale, according to the United States Geological Survey. A survey conducted by the China Earthquake Administration determined that the earthquake had a maximum intensity of VIII on the China seismic intensity scale (CSIS), based on the severity of damage to homes, several stations and sheep pens in Zhaosu County. In Kazakhstan, a maximum intensity of VII (Very strong) on the Medvedev–Sponheuer–Karnik scale was recorded in the village of Sumbe, near the epicenter. Tremors were also felt in Almaty and parts of Kyrgyzstan.

== Impact ==
Eleven people were killed in the earthquake, with 73 others injured, 26 of them seriously. Most of the victims were killed after their homes collapsed, with four children among the dead. A total of 6,200 people were affected, 80% of whom were ethnic Mongols, with 800 homes destroyed, 200 schools damaged and 247 livestock killed. The worst-affected areas were the townships of Tianshan and Xiata in Zhaosu County. The earthquake caused losses of ¥100–500 million (US$14–70 million). Ground fissures formed near the epicenter. With the earthquake occurring in the cold winter, relief efforts were hampered by low temperatures and up to 30 cm (12 in) of snowfall covering roads in the epicenter region. Homes also collapsed in the village of Sumbe in Raiymbek District, Kazakhstan.

== See also ==
- List of earthquakes in 2003
- List of earthquakes in China
- List of earthquakes in Kazakhstan
- 2003 Bachu earthquake
- 2024 Uqturpan earthquake
