= List of earthquakes in 2003 =

Earthquakes in 2003
Approximate epicenters of the earthquakes in 2003
- 4.0–5.9 magnitude
- 6.0–6.9 magnitude
- 7.0–7.9 magnitude
- 8.0+ magnitude
- Strongest magnitude: 8.3 M_{w} Japan
- Deadliest: 6.6 M_{w} (Iran) Iran; 34,000 deaths
- Total fatalities: 36,841

Number by magnitude
- 9.0+: 0
- 8.0–8.9: 1
- 7.0–7.9: 14
- 6.0–6.9: 139
- 5.0–5.9: 1,212
- 4.0–4.9: 8,455

This is a list of earthquakes in 2003. Only earthquakes of magnitude 6 or above are included, unless they result in significant damage and/or casualties. All dates are listed according to UTC time. The maximum intensities are based on the Modified Mercalli intensity scale. Earthquake magnitudes are based on data from the United States Geological Survey. The year 2003 was a relatively active and extremely deadly year for seismicity, with 15 major earthquakes and nearly 37,000 fatalities; about 34,000 deaths were attributed to a M_{w} 6.6 event in Iran, which occurred near the end of the year. The largest event of the year was the M_{w} 8.3 Tokachi earthquake in Japan, which caused relatively moderate damage and few fatalities despite its great intensity. Other notable events also struck Algeria, China, Turkey, Mexico, Kazakhstan and Myanmar.

== Compared to other years ==
Number of earthquakes worldwide for 1999–2009 []
Magnitude	1999	2000	2001	2002	2003	2004	2005	2006	2007	2008	2009
8.0–9.9	0	1	1	0	1	2	1	2	4	1	1
7.0–7.9	18	15	14	13	14	14	10	9	14	12	16
6.0–6.9	117	145	122	126	139	141	139	142	178	167	143
5.0–5.9	1,057	1,334	1,212	1,170	1,212	1,511	1,694	1,726	2,090	1,786	1,912
4.0–4.9	7,004	7,968	7,969	8,479	8,455	10,880	13,893	12,843	12,081	12,294	6,817
Total	8,296	9,462	9,319	9,788	9,823	12,551	15,738	14,723	14,367	14,261	8,891

== Overall ==
=== By death toll ===
Rank	Death toll	Magnitude	Location	MMI	Depth (km)	Date	Event
1	34,000	6.6	Iran, Kerman	X (Extreme)	10.0	December 26	2003 Bam earthquake
2	2,266	6.8	Algeria, Boumerdès offshore	X (Extreme)	12.0	May 21	2003 Boumerdès earthquake
3	268	6.3	China, Xinjiang	IX (Violent)	11.0	February 24	2003 Bachu earthquake
4	177	6.4	Turkey, Bingöl	IX (Violent)	10.0	May 1	2003 Bingöl earthquake
5	29	7.6	Mexico, Colima offshore	VIII (Severe)	24.0	January 22	2003 Colima earthquake
6	16	6.0	China, Yunnan	VII (Very strong)	10.0	July 21	2003 Dayao earthquake
7	11	6.0	Kazakhstan, Almaty	IX (Violent)	10.0	December 1	2003 Zhaosu earthquake
8	10	6.6	Myanmar, Magway	X (Extreme)	10.0	September 21	2003 Taungdwingyi earthquake

Listed are earthquakes with at least 10 dead.

=== By magnitude ===
Rank	Magnitude	Death toll	Location	MMI	Depth (km)	Date	Event
1	8.3	2	Japan, Hokkaido offshore	IX (Violent)	27.0	September 25	2003 Tokachi earthquake
2	7.8	0	United States, Alaska offshore	IV (Light)	33.0	November 17	-
3	7.6	29	Mexico, Colima offshore	VIII (Severe)	24.0	January 22	2003 Colima earthquake
3	7.6	0	Carlsberg Ridge	I (Not felt)	10.0	July 15	-
3	7.6	0	Antarctica, South Orkney Islands offshore	VI (Strong)	10.0	August 4	-
6	7.4	0	Japan, Hokkaido offshore	VIII (Severe)	27.0	September 25	-
7	7.3	0	Solomon Islands, Makira-Ulawa offshore	VIII (Severe)	33.0	January 20	-
7	7.3	3	Russia, Altai	X (Extreme)	16.0	September 27	2003 Altai earthquake
7	7.3	0	New Caledonia, Loyalty Islands offshore	V (Moderate)	10.0	December 27	-
10	7.2	0	New Zealand, Southland offshore	VIII (Severe)	28.0	August 21	2003 Fiordland earthquake
11	7.1	0	United States, Alaska offshore	III (Weak)	33.0	March 17	-
11	7.1	0	Brazil, Amazonas	IV (Light)	558.1	June 20	-
13	7.0	0	Japan, Miyagi	IX (Violent)	68.0	May 26	2003 Miyagi earthquakes
13	7.0	1	Indonesia, North Maluku offshore	VIII (Severe)	31.0	May 26	-
13	7.0	0	Japan, Miyagi offshore	VI (Strong)	10.0	October 31	-

Listed are earthquakes with at least 7.0 magnitude.

== By month ==
=== January ===
January
- Strongest magnitude: 7.6 M_{w} Mexico
- Deadliest: 7.6 M_{w} (Mexico) Mexico; 29 deaths
- Total fatalities: 31

Number by magnitude
- 8.0–8.9: 0
- 7.0–7.9: 2
- 6.0–6.9: 8
- 5.0–5.9: 96
- 4.0–4.9: 577

Date	Country and location	M_{w}	Depth (km)	MMI	Notes	Casualties	
Date	Country and location	M_{w}	Depth (km)	MMI	Notes	Dead	Injured
4	Fiji, Eastern offshore, 262 km (163 mi) WNW of Haveluloto, Tonga	6.5	378.0	-	-	-	-
4	China, Xinjiang, 88 km (55 mi) E of Kashgar	5.2	33.0	V	Foreshock of the 2003 Bachu earthquake. Several homes destroyed in Jiashi County.	-	-
6	Philippines, Central Luzon offshore, 25 km (16 mi) WSW of Bolitoc	6.0	10.0	VII	-	-	-
9	Tonga, Haʻapai offshore, 199 km (124 mi) NW of Nuku‘alofa	6.0	10.0	-	-	-	-
10	Papua New Guinea, Autonomous Region of Bougainville offshore, 191 km (119 mi) SE of Kokopo	6.7	71.9	VI	-	-	-
11	Iran, Fars, 17 km (11 mi) W of Kazerun	5.2	33.0	VII	Several people injured, 650 homes destroyed and 1,350 others damaged in the Kazerun-Nurabad area.	-	Several
16	United States, Oregon offshore, 391 km (243 mi) W of Yachats	6.3	10.0	-	-	-	-
20	Solomon Islands, Makira-Ulawa offshore, 126 km (78 mi) W of Kirakira	7.3	33.0	VIII	A local tsunami observed on Makira.	-	-
21	Guatemala, Escuintla offshore, 33 km (21 mi) S of Puerto San José	6.5	24.0	VIII	One person died of a heart attack in Escuintla and utilities disrupted in Cobán, Coatepeque, Guatemala City, Quetzaltenango, San Marcos and Sololá.	1	-
22	Mexico, Colima offshore, 16 km (9.9 mi) SSW of Cuyutlán	7.6	24.0	VIII	Further information: 2003 Colima earthquake	29	1,073
23	Indonesia, West Nusa Tenggara, 30 km (19 mi) SSE of Dompu	5.5	33.0	VII	Two people injured and 500 buildings damaged in the Dompu area.	-	2
27	Turkey, Tunceli, 2 km (1.2 mi) NW of Pülümür	6.1	10.0	VIII	One person killed, several injured and several buildings damaged in the Erzincan-Pülümür area.	1	Several
27	South Africa, Prince Edward Islands offshore	6.4	10.0	-	-	-	-

=== February ===
February
- Strongest magnitude: 6.6 M_{w} United States
- Deadliest: 6.3 M_{w} (China) China; 268 deaths
- Total fatalities: 273

Number by magnitude
- 8.0–8.9: 0
- 7.0–7.9: 0
- 6.0–6.9: 5
- 5.0–5.9: 81
- 4.0–4.9: 556

Date	Country and location	M_{w}	Depth (km)	MMI	Notes	Casualties	
Date	Country and location	M_{w}	Depth (km)	MMI	Notes	Dead	Injured
10	Papua New Guinea, West New Britain, 34 km (21 mi) NE of Kandrian	6.3	33.0	VIII	-	-	-
12	Papua New Guinea, East Sepik offshore, 49 km (30 mi) NNE of Angoram	6.2	10.0	VIII	-	-	-
15	Philippines, Bicol offshore, 2 km (1.2 mi) N of Palanas	5.8	10.0	IX	Foreshock of the 6.3 event later that day. Some roads damaged in Dimasalang.	-	-
15	Philippines, Bicol offshore, 11 km (6.8 mi) SSW of San Vicente	6.3	10.0	VIII	Some buildings damaged and power outages in Masbate City.	-	-
19	United States, Alaska offshore, 92 km (57 mi) SE of Akutan	6.6	19.0	IV	-	-	-
22	France, Grand Est, 4 km (2.5 mi) W of Rambervillers	5.0	10.0	VI	Minor damage in the Baccarat-Colmar-Thann area, France and in Edingen-Neckarhausen, Germany.	-	-
24	China, Xinjiang, 107 km (66 mi) E of Kashgar	6.3	11.0	IX	Further information: 2003 Bachu earthquake	268	4,853
24	China, Xinjiang, 119 km (74 mi) N of Shache	5.4	10.0	VII	Aftershock of the 2003 Bachu earthquake. Five people killed and additional damage in Bachu County.	5	-

=== March ===
March
- Strongest magnitude: 7.1 M_{w} United States
- Deadliest: 6.5 M_{w} (Indonesia) Indonesia; 4 deaths
- Total fatalities: 5

Number by magnitude
- 8.0–8.9: 0
- 7.0–7.9: 1
- 6.0–6.9: 15
- 5.0–5.9: 86
- 4.0–4.9: 679

Date	Country and location	M_{w}	Depth (km)	MMI	Notes	Casualties	
Date	Country and location	M_{w}	Depth (km)	MMI	Notes	Dead	Injured
1	Indonesia, West Papua offshore, 96 km (60 mi) SSE of Manokwari	6.0	28.1	VIII	Aftershock of the 2002 West Papua earthquake.	-	-
2	Southern Mid-Atlantic Ridge	6.2	10.0	-	-	-	-
9	Indonesia, Maluku offshore, 235 km (146 mi) SW of Tual	6.0	45.9	VI	-	-	-
10	Indonesia, North Maluku offshore, 79 km (49 mi) W of Tobelo	6.4	93.8	VI	-	-	-
10	Papua New Guinea, New Ireland offshore, 114 km (71 mi) ESE of Kokopo	6.8	40.2	VIII	Rockfalls and utilities disrupted on the Gazelle Peninsula.	-	-
12	Mexico, Sonora offshore, 87 km (54 mi) SW of Paredón Colorado	6.4	10.0	VI	-	-	-
14	Indonesia, Southwest Papua offshore, 133 km (83 mi) WNW of Manokwari	6.3	33.0	VIII	-	-	-
14	Tonga, Vava‘u offshore, 186 km (116 mi) NW of Neiafu	6.4	274.9	-	-	-	-
15	Russia, Kamchatka offshore, 147 km (91 mi) SE of Petropavlovsk-Kamchatsky	6.1	30.2	III	-	-	-
17	United States, Alaska offshore, 370 km (230 mi) ESE of Attu Station	7.1	33.0	III	Foreshock of the 7.8 event on November 17.	-	-
17	United States, Alaska offshore, 369 km (229 mi) ESE of Attu Station	6.2	33.0	-	Aftershock of the 7.1 event.	-	-
19	Solomon Islands, Western offshore, 144 km (89 mi) S of Gizo	6.2	33.5	-	-	-	-
21	Indonesia, West Java, 1 km (0.62 mi) WSW of Kuningan	4.6	33.0	IV	At least 800 buildings damaged in Kuningan.	-	-
25	Indonesia, East Nusa Tenggara offshore, 46 km (29 mi) NE of Ruteng	6.5	33.0	VIII	Four people killed by rockslides, 20 injured, several buildings and a pier damaged in the Reo area.	4	20
28	Tonga, Vava‘u offshore, 76 km (47 mi) NNE of Neiafu	6.2	41.2	VI	-	-	-
29	Afghanistan, Badakhshan, 68 km (42 mi) NNW of Parun	5.9	114.1	IV	One person killed and two others injured in Bajaur District, Pakistan.	1	2
30	Indonesia, Maluku offshore, 92 km (57 mi) NW of Ambon	6.2	33.0	VIII	-	-	-
31	Papua New Guinea, East New Britain offshore, 159 km (99 mi) ESE of Kimbe	6.2	46.8	VI	-	-	-

=== April ===
April
- Strongest magnitude: 6.5 M_{w} Norway
- Total fatalities: 0

Number by magnitude
- 8.0–8.9: 0
- 7.0–7.9: 0
- 6.0–6.9: 8
- 5.0–5.9: 76
- 4.0–4.9: 666

Date	Country and location	M_{w}	Depth (km)	MMI	Notes	Casualties	
Date	Country and location	M_{w}	Depth (km)	MMI	Notes	Dead	Injured
2	Northern Mid-Atlantic Ridge	6.3	10.0	-	-	-	-
10	Turkey, İzmir, 10 km (6.2 mi) ENE of Seferihisar	5.8	10.0	VII	At least 90 people injured and some buildings damaged in İzmir. Several houses collapsed and some buildings damaged in Seferihisar.	-	90
10	Afghanistan, Badakhshan, 59 km (37 mi) NNW of Parun	4.6	33.0	III	About 200 houses destroyed and landslides in Yaka Bagh.	-	-
11	Panama, Veraguas offshore, 124 km (77 mi) SSE of Punta de Burica	6.2	10.0	-	-	-	-
11	Italy, Piedmont, 1 km (0.62 mi) SSW of Carezzano Maggiore	5.0	4.0	VII	Two people injured in Turin.	-	2
17	China, Qinghai, 278 km (173 mi) SSW of Laojunmiao	6.4	14.0	IX	At least 45 homes destroyed, 1,000 others damaged and some livestock killed in Delingha.	-	-
17	Norway, Bouvet Island offshore	6.5	10.0	-	-	-	-
24	Russia, Sakhalin offshore, 227 km (141 mi) SSW of Severo-Kurilsk	6.1	43.8	-	-	-	-
27	Vanuatu, Tafea offshore, 163 km (101 mi) SSE of Isangel	6.3	77.4	I	-	-	-
27	Brazil, Acre, 91 km (57 mi) W of Tarauacá	6.0	559.9	-	-	-	-
29	Russia, Sakhalin offshore, 87 km (54 mi) E of Shikotan	6.0	62.5	IV	-	-	-

=== May ===
May
- Strongest magnitude: 7.0 M_{w} Japan; 7.0 M_{w} Indonesia
- Deadliest: 6.8 M_{w} (Algeria) Algeria; 2,266 deaths
- Total fatalities: 2,454

Number by magnitude
- 8.0–8.9: 0
- 7.0–7.9: 2
- 6.0–6.9: 17
- 5.0–5.9: 89
- 4.0–4.9: 695

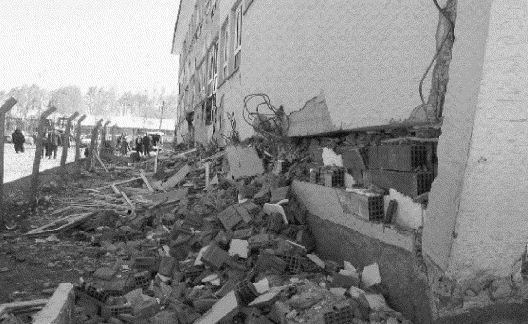
A damaged building in Bingöl, Turkey

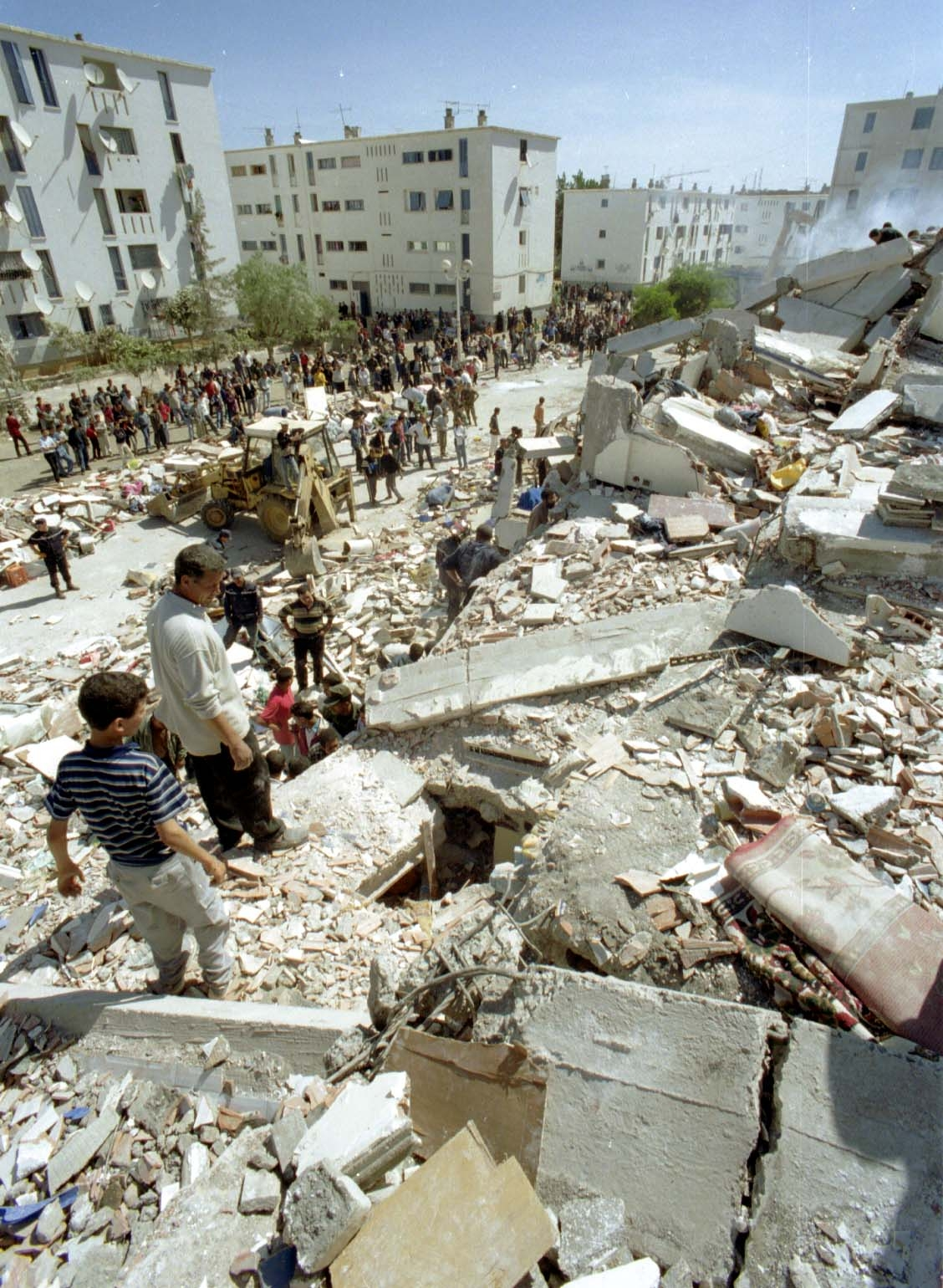
A building destroyed in Boumerdès, Algeria by the earthquake

Date	Country and location	M_{w}	Depth (km)	MMI	Notes	Casualties	
Date	Country and location	M_{w}	Depth (km)	MMI	Notes	Dead	Injured
1	Turkey, Bingöl, 13 km (8.1 mi) N of Bingöl	6.4	10.0	IX	Further information: 2003 Bingöl earthquake	177	520
3	Tonga, Niua offshore, 89 km (55 mi) N of Hihifo	6.2	33.0	VI	-	-	-
4	New Zealand, Kermadec Islands offshore	6.7	62.4	-	-	-	-
4	Solomon Islands, Temotu offshore, 83 km (52 mi) SE of Lata	6.0	33.0	VII	-	-	-
4	China, Xinjiang, 105 km (65 mi) E of Kashgar	5.8	10.0	VII	Aftershock of the 2003 Bachu earthquake. One person died from a heart attack, three others injured, 1,600 houses destroyed, several thousand buildings damaged and 1,000 livestock killed in Yopurga County.	1	3
4	New Zealand, Kermadec Islands offshore	6.4	45.6	-	-	-	-
5	Indonesia, North Maluku offshore, 62 km (39 mi) SSW of Sofifi	6.4	123.6	V	-	-	-
5	Indonesia, North Sulawesi offshore, 219 km (136 mi) N of Tobelo	6.2	56.0	-	-	-	-
9	South Africa, Prince Edward Islands offshore	6.3	10.0	-	-	-	-
11	Japan, Chiba, 1 km (0.62 mi) N of Matsudo	5.3	66.8	VI	Three people injured in Tokyo.	-	3
11	Indonesia, North Maluku offshore, 202 km (126 mi) SSW of Ternate	6.1	30.2	VII	-	-	-
13	Vanuatu, Shefa offshore, 78 km (48 mi) NW of Port Vila	6.3	33.0	VII	-	-	-
14	North Atlantic Ocean	6.7	41.5	IV	-	-	-
14	Indonesia, West Java offshore, 96 km (60 mi) S of Banjar	6.0	79.1	IV	-	-	-
19	Fiji, Eastern offshore, 213 km (132 mi) E of Levuka	6.0	563.8	-	-	-	-
19	Mexico, Colima offshore, 201 km (125 mi) SSW of Barra de Navidad	6.1	10.0	I	-	-	-
21	Algeria, Boumerdès offshore, 25 km (16 mi) WNW of Dellys	6.8	12.0	X	Further information: 2003 Boumerdès earthquake	2,266	10,261
26	Japan, Miyagi, 27 km (17 mi) SSW of Ōfunato	7.0	68.0	IX	Further information: 2003 Miyagi earthquakes	-	174
26	Indonesia, North Maluku offshore, 116 km (72 mi) NE of Tobelo	7.0	31.0	VIII	One person killed, seven others injured, 28 houses destroyed, 20 others damaged and power lines broken in Morotai Island Regency.	1	7
26	Philippines, Bangsamoro offshore, 34 km (21 mi) W of Gadung	6.9	565.8	II	-	-	-
27	Algeria, Boumerdès offshore, 21 km (13 mi) NNE of Boumerdès	5.8	8.0	VIII	Aftershock of the 2003 Boumerdès earthquake. Nine people killed, 200 others injured and several previously-weakened buildings collapsed in the Algiers-Boumerdès-Réghaïa area.	9	200
28	Mauritius, Rodrigues offshore, 363 km (226 mi) NE of Port Mathurin	6.2	10.0	-	-	-	-

=== June ===
June
- Strongest magnitude: 7.1 M_{w} Brazil
- Deadliest: 4.6 M_{w} (Iran) Iran; 1 death
- Total fatalities: 1

Number by magnitude
- 8.0–8.9: 0
- 7.0–7.9: 1
- 6.0–6.9: 10
- 5.0–5.9: 76
- 4.0–4.9: 700

Date	Country and location	M_{w}	Depth (km)	MMI	Notes	Casualties	
Date	Country and location	M_{w}	Depth (km)	MMI	Notes	Dead	Injured
3	Peru, Arequipa offshore, 81 km (50 mi) SSW of Quilca	6.0	33.0	IV	-	-	-
7	Papua New Guinea, East New Britain offshore, 87 km (54 mi) SSE of Kokopo	6.6	33.0	VII	-	-	-
9	Greece, Thessaly, 7 km (4.3 mi) E of Tsaritsani	5.2	17.8	VI	Fifty buildings damaged in the Gonnoi-Larissa area.	-	-
10	Taiwan, Hualien offshore, 50 km (31 mi) S of Hualien City	6.0	44.5	VIII	-	-	-
12	Papua New Guinea, Autonomous Region of Bougainville offshore, 88 km (55 mi) WNW of Panguna	6.3	186.3	IV	-	-	-
15	United States, Alaska offshore, 293 km (182 mi) ESE of Attu Station	6.5	20.0	III	Foreshock of the 7.8 event on November 17.	-	-
16	Russia, Kamchatka, 25 km (16 mi) ESE of Atlasovo	6.9	174.8	V	-	-	-
20	Brazil, Amazonas, 105 km (65 mi) E of Cruzeiro do Sul	7.1	558.1	IV	-	-	-
20	Chile, Coquimbo, 42 km (26 mi) W of Ovalle	6.8	33.0	VIII	Some buildings and transformers damaged and utilities disrupted in Ovalle. One person injured in San Juan, Argentina.	-	1
23	United States, Alaska offshore, 291 km (181 mi) SE of Attu Station	6.9	20.0	IV	Foreshock of the 7.8 event on November 17.	-	-
24	Iran, Lorestan, 56 km (35 mi) SSW of Aligudarz	4.6	33.0	VI	One person killed and a landslide killed 85 livestock in Aligudarz.	1	-
26	Philippines, Bicol offshore, 4 km (2.5 mi) ENE of Miaga	6.0	10.0	VIII	Aftershock of the 6.3 event on February 15.	-	-
28	Papua New Guinea, Manus offshore, 189 km (117 mi) SW of Lorengau	6.3	10.0	-	-	-	-

=== July ===
July
- Strongest magnitude: 7.6 M_{w} Carlsberg Ridge
- Deadliest: 6.0 M_{w} (China) China; 19 deaths
- Total fatalities: 22

Number by magnitude
- 8.0–8.9: 0
- 7.0–7.9: 1
- 6.0–6.9: 14
- 5.0–5.9: 111
- 4.0–4.9: 669

Date	Country and location	M_{w}	Depth (km)	MMI	Notes	Casualties	
Date	Country and location	M_{w}	Depth (km)	MMI	Notes	Dead	Injured
1	Philippines, Zamboanga Peninsula offshore, 179 km (111 mi) SSE of Tabiauan	6.0	635.4	-	-	-	-
1	Philippines, Eastern Visayas offshore, 22 km (14 mi) NW of Cabodiongan	6.0	33.0	VII	-	-	-
3	Iran, Razavi Khorasan, 29 km (18 mi) NNE of Torbat-e Jam	5.2	40.8	IV	At least 150 houses damaged in the Yakhak-Bashirabad-Buteh Gaz area.	-	-
3	Tonga, ʻEua offshore, 44 km (27 mi) E of ʻOhonua	6.0	10.0	-	-	-	-
7	Papua New Guinea, East New Britain, 140 km (87 mi) SSW of Kokopo	6.1	10.0	VIII	-	-	-
10	Iran, Fars, 57 km (35 mi) SW of Darab	5.8	10.0	VIII	One person killed, 25 others injured and 3,500 homes destroyed in the Hajjiabad area.	1	25
15	Papua New Guinea, New Ireland, 41 km (25 mi) N of Rabaul	6.5	33.0	VIII	-	-	-
15	Carlsberg Ridge	7.6	10.0	I	-	-	-
17	Mexico, Jalisco offshore, 241 km (150 mi) SW of La Cruz de Loreto	6.0	10.0	-	-	-	-
21	Papua New Guinea, West New Britain, 111 km (69 mi) NW of Kandrian	6.4	189.6	IV	-	-	-
21	China, Yunnan, 75 km (47 mi) SSW of Dadukou	6.0	10.0	VII	Further information: 2003 Dayao earthquake	19	644
22	Vanuatu, Sanma offshore, 108 km (67 mi) WSW of Port Olry	6.0	33.0	VII	-	-	-
25	Papua New Guinea, New Ireland, 168 km (104 mi) NW of Kavieng	6.4	24.0	VIII	-	-	-
25	Japan, Miyagi, 7 km (4.3 mi) NW of Matsushima	6.1	6.0	VIII	Further information: 2003 Miyagi earthquakes	-	677
26	Turkey, Denizli, 8 km (5.0 mi) NE of Buldan	4.5	10.0	VI	Foreshock of the 5.4 event later that day. Several people injured and 48 homes damaged in Buldan.	-	Several
26	Turkey, Denizli, 8 km (5.0 mi) ESE of Buldan	5.4	10.0	VII	Ten people injured, one home destroyed and dozens of buildings damaged in Buldan.	-	10
26	Bangladesh, Chittagong, 44 km (27 mi) SE of Khagrachhari	5.7	10.0	VII	Two people killed, 25 others injured, 500 buildings damaged or destroyed and power outages, landslides and subsidence in the Chittagong-Cox's Bazar-Rangamati area.	2	25
27	Tonga, Tongatapu offshore, 142 km (88 mi) W of Haveluloto	6.6	212.9	-	-	-	-
27	Russia, Primorsky offshore, 97 km (60 mi) NE of Svetlaya	6.8	470.3	I	-	-	-
27	Bolivia, Chuquisaca, 56 km (35 mi) N of Camargo	6.0	345.3	IV	-	-	-

=== August ===
August
- Strongest magnitude: 7.6 M_{w} Antarctica
- Deadliest: 5.4 M_{w} China; 4 deaths
- Total fatalities: 4

Number by magnitude
- 8.0–8.9: 0
- 7.0–7.9: 2
- 6.0–6.9: 9
- 5.0–5.9: 119
- 4.0–4.9: 765

Date	Country and location	M_{w}	Depth (km)	MMI	Notes	Casualties	
Date	Country and location	M_{w}	Depth (km)	MMI	Notes	Dead	Injured
4	Antarctica, South Orkney Islands offshore, 60 km (37 mi) NE of Laurie Island	7.6	10.0	VI	Minor damage at Orcadas Base on Laurie Island.	-	-
11	Indonesia, North Maluku, 66 km (41 mi) SSE of Tobelo	6.0	10.0	VIII	About 200 homes damaged in the Wasile area.	-	-
11	Australia offshore, west of Macquarie Island	6.0	10.0	-	-	-	-
11	India, Andaman and Nicobar Islands offshore, 99 km (62 mi) ENE of Port Blair	6.0	100.2	-	-	-	-
14	Greece, Epirus, 8 km (5.0 mi) S of Kanaláki	6.3	10.0	IX	Fifty people injured, some buildings and infrastructure damaged and landslides occurred in Lefkada. Damage to buildings in the Preveza area.	-	50
16	China, Inner Mongolia, 175 km (109 mi) NNE of Chifeng	5.4	24.4	VII	Four people killed, 1,000 injured, 7,900 homes destroyed and 83,000 damaged in the Lindong-Tianshan area.	4	1,000
21	Iran, Sistan and Baluchestan, 96 km (60 mi) SSW of Nosratabad	5.9	20.2	IX	Some buildings damaged in Bam.	-	-
21	New Zealand, Southland offshore, 56 km (35 mi) NW of Te Anau	7.2	28.0	VIII	Further information: 2003 Fiordland earthquake	-	-
25	Guatemala, Escuintla, 5 km (3.1 mi) SSW of La Gomera	6.0	100.0	V	-	-	-
28	Southern East Pacific Rise	6.2	10.0	-	-	-	-
28	Indonesia, Maluku offshore, 131 km (81 mi) N of Manatutu, Timor Leste	6.0	409.2	I	-	-	-
30	Vanuatu, Sanma offshore, 32 km (20 mi) E of Port Vila	6.0	137.0	IV	-	-	-
31	Russia, Primorsky, 6 km (3.7 mi) E of Knevichi	6.2	481.1	I	-	-	-

=== September ===
September
- Strongest magnitude: 8.3 M_{w} Japan
- Deadliest: 6.6 M_{w} (Myanmar) Myanmar; 10 deaths
- Total fatalities: 18

Number by magnitude
- 8.0–8.9: 1
- 7.0–7.9: 2
- 6.0–6.9: 14
- 5.0–5.9: 131
- 4.0–4.9: 736

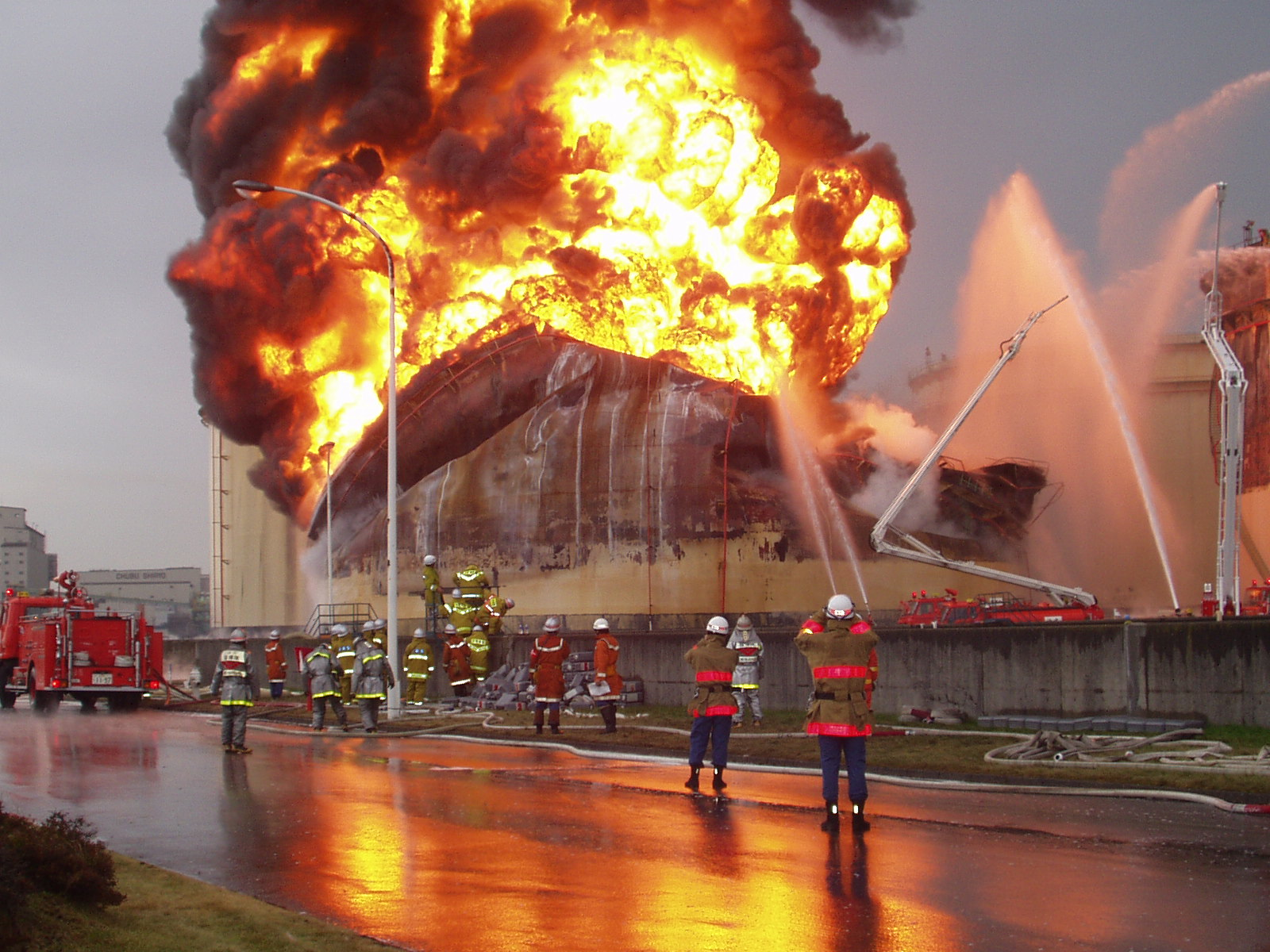
Oil tank fire caused by the earthquake in Tomakomai, Japan.

Date	Country and location	M_{w}	Depth (km)	MMI	Notes	Casualties	
Date	Country and location	M_{w}	Depth (km)	MMI	Notes	Dead	Injured
2	Tonga, Niua offshore, 101 km (63 mi) NE of Hihifo	6.4	10.0	V	-	-	-
6	Central East Pacific Rise	6.1	10.0	-	-	-	-
7	New Caledonia, Loyalty Islands offshore	6.4	33.0	-	-	-	-
11	Solomon Islands, Western offshore, 76 km (47 mi) W of Gizo	6.0	10.0	VI	-	-	-
12	Papua New Guinea, East New Britain, 133 km (83 mi) SW of Kokopo	6.0	50.4	V	-	-	-
14	Italy, Emilia-Romagna, 3 km (1.9 mi) E of Monterenzio	5.3	10.0	VII	Some people slightly injured and 10 buildings damaged in the Loiano-Monghidoro-Monzuno area.	-	Some
20	Japan, Chiba offshore, 12 km (7.5 mi) SSE of Kamogawa	5.7	51.5	V	Seven people injured and some buildings damaged in Tokyo.	-	7
21	Myanmar, Magway, 16 km (9.9 mi) SE of Taungdwingyi	6.6	10.0	X	Further information: 2003 Taungdwingyi earthquake	10	42
21	North of Ascension Island	6.0	10.0	-	-	-	-
22	Dominican Republic, Puerto Plata, 2 km (1.2 mi) SE of Puerto Plata	6.4	10.0	X	Further information: 2003 Dominican Republic earthquake	3	Dozens
25	Japan, Hokkaido offshore, 72 km (45 mi) ESE of Hiroo	8.3	27.0	IX	Further information: 2003 Tokachi earthquake	2	849
25	Japan, Hokkaido offshore, 119 km (74 mi) ESE of Shizunai-furukawachō	7.4	27.0	VIII	Aftershocks of the 2003 Tokachi earthquake.	-	-
26	Japan, Hokkaido offshore, 110 km (68 mi) S of Kushiro	6.0	33.0	I	Aftershocks of the 2003 Tokachi earthquake.	-	-
27	Russia, Altai, 29 km (18 mi) S of Aktash	7.3	16.0	X	Further information: 2003 Altai earthquake	3	5
27	Russia, Altai, 23 km (14 mi) S of Aktash	6.4	10.0	IX	Aftershock of the 2003 Altai earthquake.	-	-
29	Japan, Hokkaido offshore, 58 km (36 mi) S of Kushiro	6.5	25.0	VII	Aftershock of the 2003 Tokachi earthquake.	-	-
30	Antarctica offshore, Scotia Sea	6.0	10.0	-	Aftershock of the 7.6 event on August 4.	-	-
30	New Zealand, Kermadec Islands offshore	6.4	10.0	-	-	-	-
30	New Zealand, Kermadec Islands offshore	6.0	33.0	-	Aftershock of the 6.4 event an hour earlier.	-	-

=== October ===
October
- Strongest magnitude: 7.0 M_{w} Japan
- Deadliest: 5.8 M_{w} China; 9 deaths
- Total fatalities: 12

Number by magnitude
- 8.0–8.9: 0
- 7.0–7.9: 1
- 6.0–6.9: 10
- 5.0–5.9: 114
- 4.0–4.9: 758

Date	Country and location	M_{w}	Depth (km)	MMI	Notes	Casualties	
Date	Country and location	M_{w}	Depth (km)	MMI	Notes	Dead	Injured
1	Russia, Altai, 9 km (5.6 mi) S of Aktash	6.7	10.0	X	Aftershock of the 2003 Altai earthquake. Additional damage and landslides in Kosh-Agach. Minor damage to buildings in Barnaul and Gorno-Altaysk.	-	-
7	American Samoa, Western offshore, 246 km (153 mi) SSE of Vaitogi	6.2	10.0	-	-	-	-
29	Japan, Hokkaido offshore, 39 km (24 mi) SSE of Kushiro	6.7	32.0	VI	Aftershock of the 2003 Tokachi earthquake.	-	-
9	Philippines, Mimaropa offshore, 67 km (42 mi) northwest of Tagbak	6.2	33.0	VI	-	-	-
13	Fiji, Eastern offshore, 183 km (114 mi) S of Alo, Wallis and Futuna	6.0	10.0	-	-	-	-
15	Fiji, Eastern offshore, 211 km (131 mi) E of Levuka	6.0	582.6	-	-	-	-
16	China, Yunnan, 56 km (35 mi) SSE of Renhe	5.6	33.0	VII	Aftershock of the 2003 Dayao earthquake. Three people killed, 32 injured and 12,000 buildings damaged or destroyed in Dayao County.	3	32
17	Papua New Guinea, Autonomous Region of Bougainville offshore, 174 km (108 mi) WNW of Panguna	6.4	133.0	V	-	-	-
18	Indonesia, North Maluku offshore, 147 km (91 mi) WSW of Ternate	6.4	33.0	-	-	-	-
22	Papua New Guinea, Morobe offshore, 56 km (35 mi) NNW of Finschhafen	6.3	53.5	VII	-	-	-
25	China, Gansu, 73 km (45 mi) SE of Zhangye	5.8	10.0	VIII	Nine people killed, 43 injured, thousands homeless, 10,000 homes destroyed, 45,000 others and 2 reservoirs damaged and 16,000 livestock killed in Minle and Shandan Counties.	9	43
28	Papua New Guinea, East New Britain, 141 km (88 mi) SW of Kokopo	6.0	65.0	VII	-	-	-
31	Japan, Miyagi offshore, 133 km (83 mi) ESE of Ishinomaki	7.0	10.0	VI	A tsunami with a maximum wave height of 32 cm (1.05 ft) observed in the Tōhoku Region.	-	-

=== November ===
November
- Strongest magnitude: 7.8 M_{w} United States
- Deadliest: 5.6 M_{w} China; 4 deaths
- Total fatalities: 6

Number by magnitude
- 8.0–8.9: 0
- 7.0–7.9: 1
- 6.0–6.9: 13
- 5.0–5.9: 117
- 4.0–4.9: 827

Date	Country and location	M_{w}	Depth (km)	MMI	Notes	Casualties	
Date	Country and location	M_{w}	Depth (km)	MMI	Notes	Dead	Injured
2	New Zealand, Southland offshore, 96 km (60 mi) WNW of Te Anau	6.4	10.0	VII	Aftershock of the 2003 Fiordland earthquake.	-	-
5	Colombia, Chocó offshore, 44 km (27 mi) W of Pizarro	6.0	33.0	VII	-	-	-
6	Vanuatu, Tafea offshore, 51 km (32 mi) NW of Isangel	6.6	113.7	VII	-	-	-
9	Central Mid-Atlantic Ridge	6.6	10.0	-	-	-	-
11	New Zealand, Kermadec Islands offshore	6.1	33.0	-	An example of a doublet earthquake.	-	-
11	New Zealand, Kermadec Islands offshore	6.1	33.0	-	An example of a doublet earthquake.	-	-
11	Japan, Volcano Islands offshore	6.0	101.0	-	-	-	-
12	Indonesia, North Maluku offshore, 134 km (83 mi) NW of Ternate	6.2	33.0	III	-	-	-
12	Japan, Wakayama offshore, 118 km (73 mi) ESE of Shingū	6.4	384.9	I	-	-	-
13	China, Gansu, 104 km (65 mi) WNW of Mawu	5.1	10.0	VI	One person killed, 30 others injure, 10 buildings destroyed, many others and some roads damaged in the Jonê-Lintan-Min area.	1	30
13	Australia offshore, west of Macquarie Island	6.0	10.0	-	-	-	-
14	Vanuatu region offshore	6.1	10.0	-	-	-	-
14	China, Yunnan, 25 km (16 mi) ENE of Zhaotong	5.6	33.0	VII	Four people killed, 65 injured, 600 homes destroyed, 98,000 buildings damaged and power outages occurred in Ludian and Zhaotong Counties.	4	65
17	United States, Alaska offshore, 335 km (208 mi) WSW of Adak	7.8	33.0	IV	A tsunami generated with recorded wave height of 52 cm (1.71 ft) at Shemya and 20 cm (7.9 in) at Adak.	-	-
18	Philippines, Eastern Visayas, 4 km (2.5 mi) NW of Can-avid	6.5	35.0	VIII	One person killed, 21 injured, one school collapsed and many concrete structures damaged in Can-avid. A landslide blocked a highway near Taft. Power outages occurred throughout Eastern Samar.	1	21
25	Papua New Guinea, West New Britain, 82 km (51 mi) E of Kimbe	6.6	35.0	VIII	-	-	-
26	China, Yunnan, 5 km (3.1 mi) SE of Zhaotong	4.7	33.0	VI	Four people injured and thousands of buildings damaged or destroyed in Ludian County.	-	4

=== December ===
December
- Strongest magnitude: 7.3 M_{w} New Caledonia
- Deadliest: 6.6 M_{w} (Iran) Iran; 34,000 deaths
- Total fatalities: 34,015

Number by magnitude
- 8.0–8.9: 0
- 7.0–7.9: 1
- 6.0–6.9: 16
- 5.0–5.9: 116
- 4.0–4.9: 829

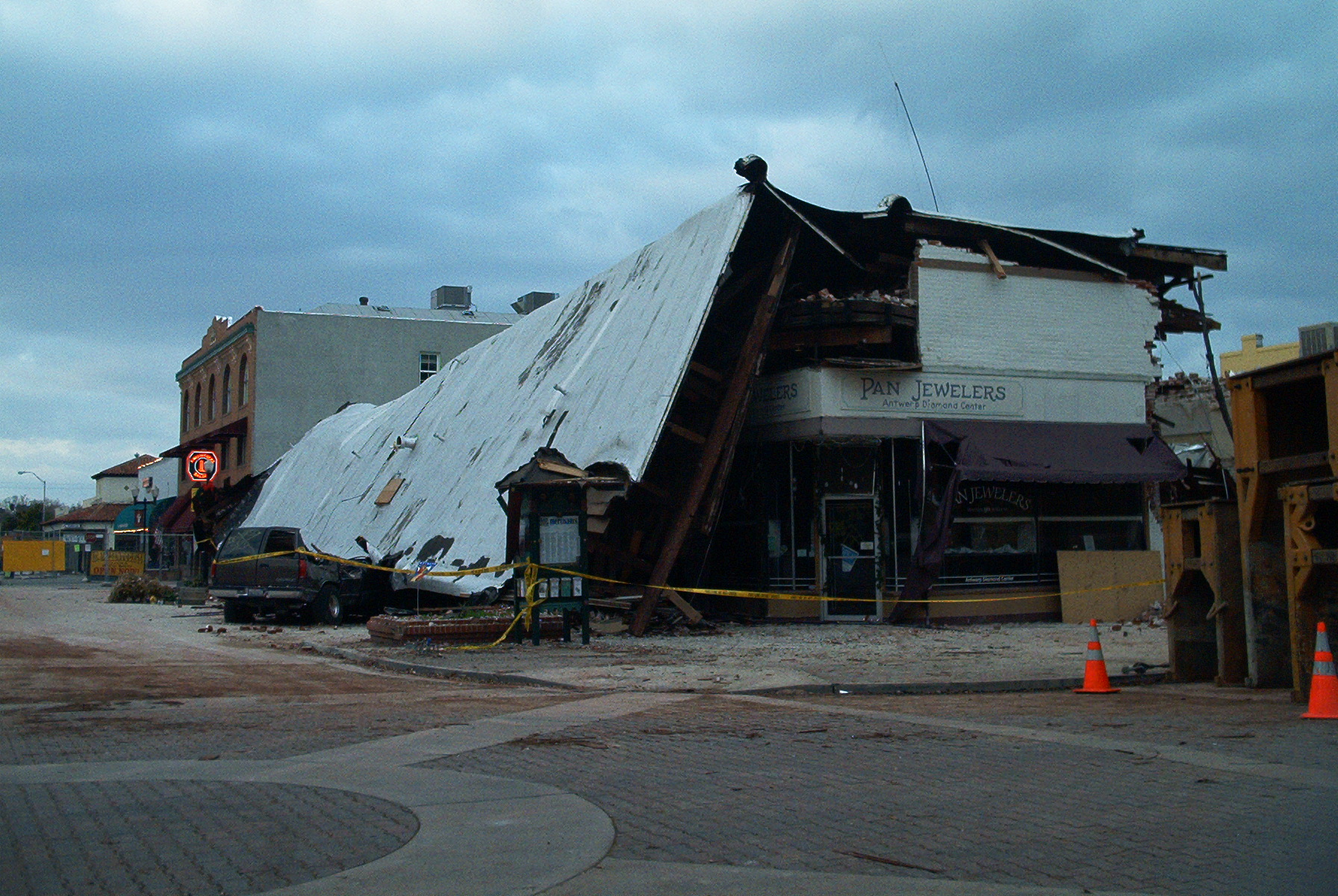
A collapsed building in California United States.

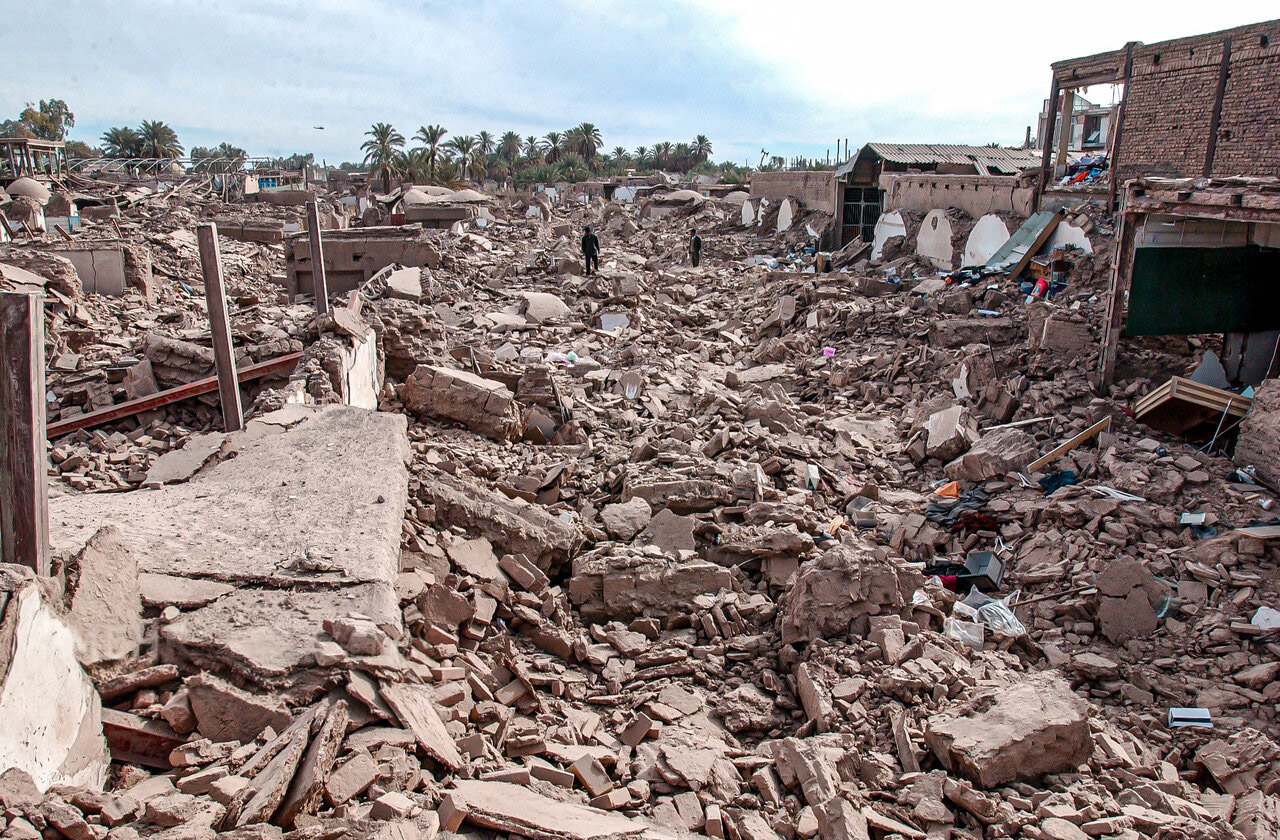
The city of Bam destroyed by the earthquake.

Date	Country and location	M_{w}	Depth (km)	MMI	Notes	Casualties	
Date	Country and location	M_{w}	Depth (km)	MMI	Notes	Dead	Injured
1	Kazakhstan, Almaty, 106 km (66 mi) E of Kegen	6.0	10.0	IX	Further information: 2003 Zhaosu earthquake	11	73
5	Russia, Kamchatka offshore, 220 km (140 mi) ESE of Ust’-Kamchatsk Staryy	6.7	10.0	II	-	-	-
9	United States, Alaska offshore, 192 km (119 mi) WSW of Adak	6.2	33.0	-	Aftershock of the 7.8 event on November 17.	-	-
10	Taiwan, Taitung offshore, 92 km (57 mi) E of Yujing	6.8	10.0	VIII	One person injured, several roads and bridges damaged and some landslides in Taitung County. A gas line broke causing a fire in Kaohsiung.	-	1
11	Iran, Khuzestan, 9 km (5.6 mi) WNW of Masjed Soleyman	5.0	33.0	VII	Five people injured, two homes destroyed and 142 others damaged at Masjed Soleyman.	-	5
17	Bulgaria, Varna, 11 km (6.8 mi) ENE of Dalgopol	4.4	33.9	IV	Ten homes collapsed and 150 buildings damaged in Provadia.	-	-
21	Central Mid-Atlantic Ridge	6.6	10.0	-	-	-	-
22	United States, California, 10 km (6.2 mi) NE of San Simeon	6.5	8.4	VIII	Further information: 2003 San Simeon earthquake	2	40
25	Panama, Chiriquí, 3 km (1.9 mi) SSE of Progreso	6.5	33.0	VIII	Further information: 2003 Puerto Armuelles earthquake	2	75
25	New Zealand, south of the Kermadec Islands	6.0	34.6	-	-	-	-
25	New Caledonia, Loyalty Islands offshore, 183 km (114 mi) ESE of Tadine	6.5	10.0	-	Foreshocks of the 7.3 event on December 27.	-	-
25	New Caledonia, Loyalty Islands offshore, 190 km (120 mi) ESE of Tadine	6.0	10.0	-	Foreshocks of the 7.3 event on December 27.	-	-
26	Iran, Kerman, 13 km (8.1 mi) SSW of Bam	6.6	10.0	X	Further information: 2003 Bam earthquake	34,000	200,000
26	New Caledonia, Loyalty Islands offshore, 168 km (104 mi) ESE of Tadine	6.8	10.0	V	Foreshocks of the 7.3 event on December 27.	-	-
27	New Caledonia, Loyalty Islands offshore, 164 km (102 mi) ESE of Tadine	6.1	10.0	IV	Foreshocks of the 7.3 event on December 27.	-	-
27	New Caledonia, Loyalty Islands offshore, 201 km (125 mi) ESE of Tadine	7.3	10.0	V	A local tsunami with a height of 15 cm (5.9 in) observed at Port Vila, Vanuatu.	-	-
27	New Caledonia, Loyalty Islands offshore, 202 km (126 mi) E of Tadine	6.7	10.0	-	Aftershocks of the 7.3 event earlier that day.	-	-
27	New Caledonia, Loyalty Islands offshore, 195 km (121 mi) E of Tadine	6.3	10.0	-	Aftershocks of the 7.3 event earlier that day.	-	-
29	Japan, Hokkaido offshore, 64 km (40 mi) SSE of Kushiro	6.1	33.0	VI	Aftershock of the 2003 Tokachi earthquake.	-	-

== See also ==
- Lists of 21st-century earthquakes
- List of earthquakes 2001–2010
- Lists of earthquakes by year
- Lists of earthquakes
