= 2003 Miyagi earthquakes =

Earthquake in Japan

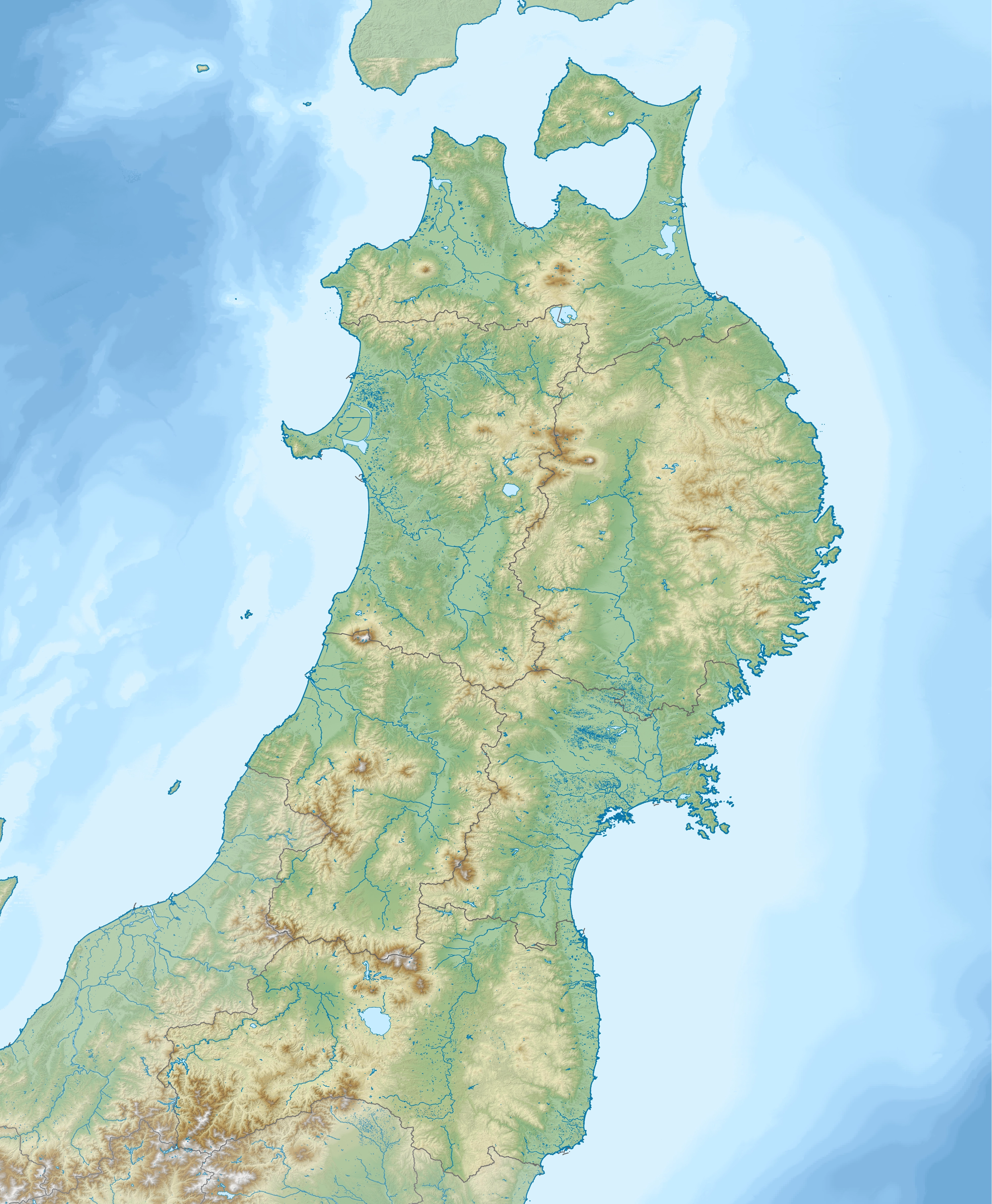
- UTC time: 2003-05-26 09:24:33; 2003-07-25 22:13:29
- ISC event: 6849185; 7006322
- USGS-ANSS: ComCat; ComCat
- Local date: May 26, 2003; July 26, 2003
- Local time: 18:24:33 JST (UTC+9); 07:13:29 JST (UTC+9)
- Magnitude: M_{w} 7.0, M_{JMA} 7.1; M_{w} 6.0, M_{JMA} 6.4
- Depth: 68.0 km (42.3 mi); 6 km (3.7 mi)
- Fault: Intraslab (May 26), Asahiyama flexure (July 26)
- Type: Oblique-reverse (May 26), Reverse (July 26)
- Total damage: ¥92.9 billion (US$644 million, equivalent to $1.12 billion in 2025)
- Max. intensity: JMA 6+ (MMI IX)
- Peak acceleration: 1.134 g (May 26); 2.08 g (July 26)
- Peak velocity: 60.13 cm/s (May 26)
- Landslides: Yes
- Aftershocks: 27 ≥M_{w}4.0 (May 26)
- Casualties: 851 injuries

Two major earthquakes struck Miyagi Prefecture in Japan in 2003. The first event measured M_{JMA} 7.1, had a near-intermediate depth of 68 km (42 mi) and struck the town of Kesennuma, near the border with Iwate Prefecture, injuring 174 people in five prefectures, while the second event, despite having a lower magnitude of M_{JMA} 6.4, was much more destructive and intense due to occurring much closer to the surface at 6 km (3.7 mi), injuring nearly 680 people across multiple towns near Sendai and Ishinomaki in Miyagi. Both events caused moderate damage to infrastructure, triggered landslides, soil liquefaction and other ground effects, and damaged or destroyed 18,488 homes, 5,108 of them severely.

== Tectonic setting ==
The Pacific plate, made of oceanic lithosphere, subducts beneath the Okhotsk Sea plate along a convergent boundary located off the east coast of the northern half of Japan. It runs from the Boso triple junction and ends near Hokkaido, where it joins the Kuril–Kamchatka Trench. At this location, the Pacific plate moves approximately westward relative to the North American plate at a velocity of 70 mm (2.8 in)/yr, subducting beneath Japan at the Japan Trench. This subduction zone is capable of producing megathrust earthquakes with magnitudes greater than 8.5, evident in the historical records. It was on the subduction interface where the 2011 Tōhoku earthquake nucleated. That event involved a 220 km (140 mi) x 400 km (250 mi) rupture area on the subduction zone.

== Earthquakes ==
=== May 26 ===
With an epicenter in Kesennuma, Miyagi Prefecture, the earthquake occurred as the result of oblique-reverse faulting at a depth of 68 km (42 mi). The United States Geological Survey (USGS) reported a magnitude of M_{wb} 7.0, while the Japan Meteorological Agency (JMA) measured the earthquake at M_{JMA} 7.1. According to GPS observations, horizontal crustal deformation of up to approximately 1.5 cm (0.59 in) was observed west of the epicenter, consistent with the earthquake's focal mechanism. The earthquake was followed by 27 aftershocks that struck throughout the remainder of 2003, most of which occurred in Kesennuma, Miyagi and Rikuzentakata, Iwate; the largest aftershock measured mb 4.8.

The earthquake had a maximum intensity of Shindo 6- on Japan Meteorological Agency seismic intensity scale, which was observed in both Miyagi and Iwate Prefectures. A USGS seismic installation at Hanamaki, Iwate recorded 0.297 g in ground acceleration (pga) and 53.31 cm/s (20.99 in/s) in ground velocity (pgv); the station data corresponded to a Modified Mercalli intensity (MMI) of IX (Violent); another station in Ishinomaki recorded a pga of 1.134 g. MMI IX shaking was also estimated in Kesennuma, based on damage to a road near the epicenter in the town. Additionally, a map created by the National Research Institute for Earth Science and Disaster Resilience estimated that shaking exceeding 1,000 gal (1.02 g) had likely been observed in much of northeastern Miyagi and southeastern Iwate.

Locations with a seismic intensity of Shindo 5- and higher
| Intensity | Prefecture | Locations |
|---|---|---|
| 6− | Miyagi | Ishinomaki, Wakuya, Kurihara |
| 6− | Iwate | Ichinoseki, Ōfunato, Hiraizumi, Ōshū |
| 5+ | Miyagi | Kesennuma, Minamisanriku, Tome, Higashimatsushima, Misato, Ōsaki, Shikama, Kami |
| 5+ | Iwate | Rikuzentakata, Morioka, Kanegasaki, Sumita, Kamaishi, Tōno, Hanamaki, Yahaba, Hirono, Ninohe |
| 5+ | Akita | Daisen |
| 5+ | Aomori | Hashikami |
| 5+ | Yamagata | Yamgata |
| 5− | Miyagi | Ōhira, Ōsato, Taiwa, Sendai, Natori, Kawasaki, Zaō, Ōgawara, Watari |
| 5− | Iwate | Kitakami, Nishiwaga, Shiwa, Takizawa, Ōtsuchi, Yamada, Miyako, Iwaizumi, Fudai, Fudai, Kuji, Hachimantai |
| 5− | Akita | Yuzawa, Ugo, Yokote, Daisen, Akita |
| 5− | Aomori | Hachinohe, Nanbu, Gonohe |
| 5− | Yamagata | Murayama |
| 5− | Fukushima | Sōma, Minamisōma, Tamura, Tomioka |

=== July 26 ===
At 07:13:29 JST (UTC+9) on 26 July (22:13 UTC on 25 July), a M_{w} 6.0 or M_{JMA} 6.4 event struck Ōsato, Miyagi, at a depth of 6 km (3.7 mi) and occurring as a result of reverse faulting. It was preceded by a M_{w} 5.5 or M_{JMA} 5.6 foreshock at 00:13:07 JST, which had a maximum intensity of Shindo 6- at Higashimatsushima. The mainshock had a maximum intensity of Shindo 6+ in Higashimatsushima and Misato, Miyagi. It also had a Modified Mercalli intensity of VIII (Severe), and a pga of 2,037 gal (2.08 g) was recorded in Naruse (now merged into Higashimatsushima), the highest ever recorded at the time. The mainshock occurred on the previously-unknown Asahiyama flexure, an 8 km (5.0 mi) north-south trending fault in Higashimatsushima. Aftershocks from the event were distributed in a 15 km x 15 km area, occurring 2–13 km (1.2–8.1 mi) beneath the surface.

Locations with a seismic intensity of Shindo 4 and higher
| Intensity | Prefecture | Locations |
|---|---|---|
| 6+ | Miyagi | Higashimatsushima, Misato |
| 6− | Miyagi | Ishinomaki, Wakuya, Ōsaki |
| 5+ | Miyagi | Tome |
| 5− | Miyagi | Kurihara, Ōsato, Sendai |
| 4 | Miyagi | Kawasaki, Ōgawara, Watari, Natori, Tagajō, Shichigahama, Rifu, Matsushima, Ōhira, Shikama, Minamisanriku, Kesennuma |
| 4 | Iwate | Rikuzentakata, Ichinoseki, Hiraizumi, Ōshū, Hanamaki, Ōtsuchi, Yahaba, Morioka, Fudai, Fudai, Ninohe |
| 4 | Akita | Daisen |
| 4 | Yamagata | Murayama, Mogami, Shinjō, Nakayama |
| 4 | Fukushima | Shinchi, Iwaki |

== Damage and injuries ==
=== May 26 ===
At least 174 people were injured, 25 of them seriously, including 91 in Iwate, 64 in Miyagi, 10 in Yamagata, 8 in Akita and 1 in Aomori. At least 23 homes partially or completely collapsed, including 12 in Iwate and 11 in Miyagi. At least 2,404 other households suffered partial damage, including 1,183 in Iwate, 1,085 in Miyagi, 132 in Fukushima and 2 each in Akita and Yamagata. Damage also occurred to 15 libraries in both prefectures, 10 of which suffered broken glass. Twenty-three piers supporting the Tōhoku Shinkansen were damaged in Iwate, mainly in Ōshū and Morioka. Five building fires and 63 landslides occurred and some power and water lines broke in Iwate and Miyagi. Possible soil liquefaction with ground subsidence of at least 10 cm (3.9 in) occurred at Ōfunato, where a 190 m (620 ft) long ground crack was observed. Overall, damage from the May 26 event was estimated at ¥33.62 billion (US$233 million).

=== July 26 ===
The M_{w} 5.5 foreshock and M_{w} 6.0 mainshock injured 677 people, including 675 in Miyagi and 2 in Yamagata; 51 of the injuries in Miyagi were classified as serious. At least 1,276 homes were completely destroyed, 3,809 were partially destroyed and 10,976 more were partially damaged; one home was damaged in Iwate Prefecture while the rest were in Miyagi. Over 47,000 people and 13,000 households were affected by water outages in eight cities and towns in Miyagi. The towns of Nango, Yamoto, Naruse and Kawanami received the worst damage, with 50 homes collapsing or suffering severe damage in Nango alone. Landslides were also reported. At Zuigan-ji Temple, many walls were affected by cracks or peeling plaster. The shaking also caused a train to derail on the Ishinomaki Line. Overall damage costs from the July 26 events were estimated at ¥59.3 billion (US$411 million).

== See also ==
- List of earthquakes in 2003
- List of earthquakes in Japan
- 1978 Miyagi earthquake
- 2011 Tohoku earthquake and tsunami
