= Yakhak =

Yakhak (Persian: يخك) may refer to:

- Yakhak, Afghanistan
- Yakhak, Iran
