= 2003 Dayao earthquake =

Earthquake in Yunnan, China

- Location within Yunnan Location within China
- UTC time: 2003-07-21 15:16:33
- ISC event: 7003234
- USGS-ANSS: ComCat
- Local date: July 21, 2003
- Local time: 23:16:33 CST (UTC+8)
- Magnitude: 5.9 M_{w} 6.1 M_{s}
- Depth: 9.2 km (5.7 mi)
- Epicenter: 25.96°N 101.25°E
- Type: Strike-slip
- Areas affected: China
- Max. intensity: MMI VII (Very strong)
- Casualties: 19 dead, 644 injured

The 2003 Dayao earthquake occurred on July 21, at 23:16:33 CST. The epicenter of the moment magnitude 5.9 earthquake was in Dayao County in the mountainous area of central Yunnan, China. At least 19 people were killed, 644 were injured, and 8,406 families became homeless. The quake also caused $75 million USD in damage.

== Tectonic setting ==
Yunnan is located at the southeastern edge of the Tibetan Plateau, where the Indian plate is colliding north–northeast into the Eurasian plate (Asia). The continental deformation is accommodated by major faults in the area, mostly of strike-slip movement. The Indian plate pushes into Asia, uplifting the Tibetan Plateau and causes it rotate clockwise, along the Xianshuihe fault system. This deformation spreads into Yunnan, where active strike-slip faulting occurs.

== Earthquake ==
The earthquake measured 6.1 on the surface-wave magnitude scale. It was the first of two strong earthquakes in the same area that year. In October, a M_{s} 6.2 (M_{w} 5.6) earthquake struck nearby, killing three people. The July earthquake occurred as a result of shallow strike-slip faulting. Coulomb stress transfer from the July quake increased the chance of failure on nearby faults which triggered the October quake.

== Impact ==
The earthquake affected 70% of Dayao County, with a total of 148 villages with 48,048 households and a population of 199,509 affected. At least 264,878 houses collapsed and nearly 1.19 million others and 336 schools were damaged In the village of Ganghe, 11 people were killed due to collapsing mudbrick homes. An aftershock on July 23 caused additional collapses and injured 51 people. In Songziyuan village, one person was killed and many homes were destroyed. Large fissures opened in roads and landslides blocked passing vehicles.

== See also ==
- List of earthquakes in 2003
- List of earthquakes in China
  - List of earthquakes in Yunnan
- 2000 Yao'an earthquake
