= Aktash, Altai Republic =

Aktash Акташ
- Selo
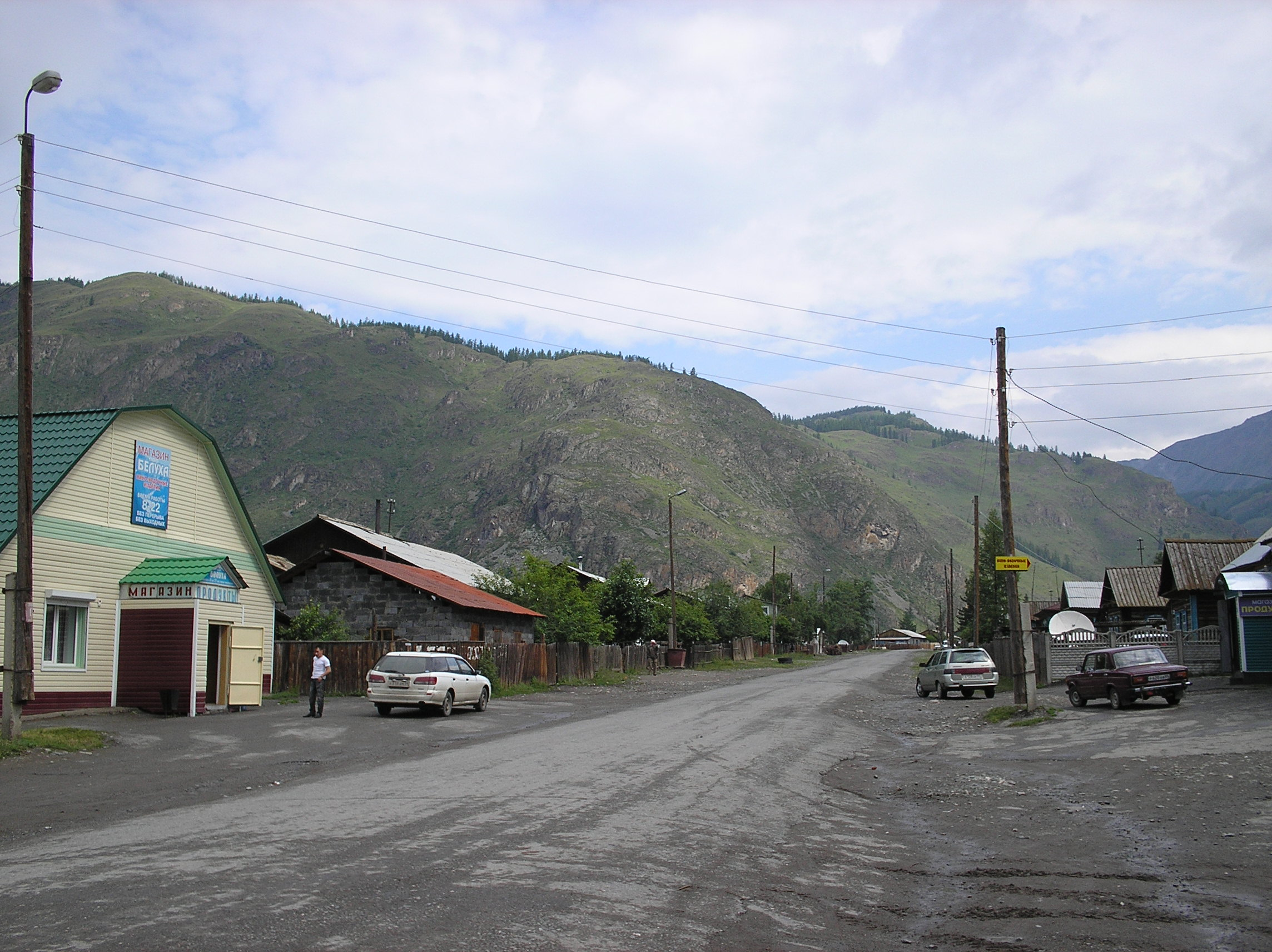

- Location within Altai Republic Location within Russia
- Coordinates: 50°18′N 87°36′E
- Country: Russia
- Region: Altai Republic
- District: Ulagansky District
- Time zone: UTC+7:00

Aktash (Russian: Акташ; Altay: Ак-Таш, Ak-Taş; Kazakh: Ақташ, Aqtaş) is a rural locality (a selo) in Ulagansky District, the Altai Republic, Russia. The population was 2418 as of 2016. There are 24 streets.

== Geography ==
Aktash is located on the southern slope of Kuray Mountains, 55 km southwest of Ulagan (the district's administrative centre) by road. Chibit is the nearest rural locality.
