= 2003 Altai earthquake =

Earthquake in Altai Republic, Russia

- Location within Altai Republic Location within Russia
- UTC time: 2003-09-27 11:33:25
- ISC event: 7136530
- USGS-ANSS: ComCat
- Local date: September 27, 2003
- Local time: 18:33
- Magnitude: 7.3 M_{w}
- Depth: 12.3 km (8 mi)
- Epicenter: 49.99°N 87.79°E
- Type: Oblique-slip
- Total damage: $10.6–33 million
- Max. intensity: MMI X (Extreme)
- Landslides: Yes
- Casualties: 3 dead, 5 injured

The 2003 Altai earthquake, or 2003 Chuya earthquake, occurred on September 27 at 18:33:26 local time with a moment magnitude of 7.3 and a maximum intensity of shaking of X (Extreme) on the Modified Mercalli intensity scale. The epicenter of this oblique-slip shock was in Altai Republic, Russia near the borders of Mongolia, China and Kazakhstan. Three deaths and five injuries were reported and the total damage was listed as $10.6–33 million.

== Tectonic setting ==
The Altai Mountains form the most northerly part of the complex zone of collision between the Indian and Eurasian plates, contributing 7 mm per year of the total 35 mm per year of convergence between the two plates, according to estimates from GPS data. The main structures accommodating this convergence are northwest–southeast trending right lateral strike-slip faults with subordinate west–east trending thrust faults, associated with the ends of the strike-slip structures. Most previous seismicity in the area in the instrumental era are dextral strike-slip in type. Only one thrust fault event (M_{w} 5.2) has been observed trending parallel to the Altai chain in this period.

== Earthquake ==
The total length of the fault rupture was about 60 km, based on observations of surface rupture, although the extent of aftershocks suggest that the rupture at depth was somewhat longer. This earthquake had components of right-lateral strike-slip and reverse movement in a segmented fault zone which had not been previously recognized. Based on field observations and the analysis of InSAR data, the fault responsible for the earthquake dips steeply to the northeast. Further analysis of the three–dimensional distribution of aftershocks, however, suggest that the fault zone is sub-vertical, extending down to a depth of 17 km. Modelling of the observed InSAR fringe pattern is consistent with at least three fault segments moving during the earthquake. The two segments to the northwest moved with dominantly right-lateral strike-slip, with a component of reverse movement. The most southeasterly segment had a pure reverse slip displacement.

== Damage ==
Between 99 and 300 houses were destroyed, along with 1,942 other buildings affected. It was the strongest earthquake in this region since an estimated magnitude 7.7 earthquake on 20 December 1761.

== Ground effects ==
Landslides affected the Kosh-Agachsky and Ust'-Ulagan Districts.

== See also ==
- List of earthquakes in 2003
- List of earthquakes in Russia
