= Yamamae Site =

Archaeological site in Japan

Yamamae ruins
- 山前遺跡 (Japanese)
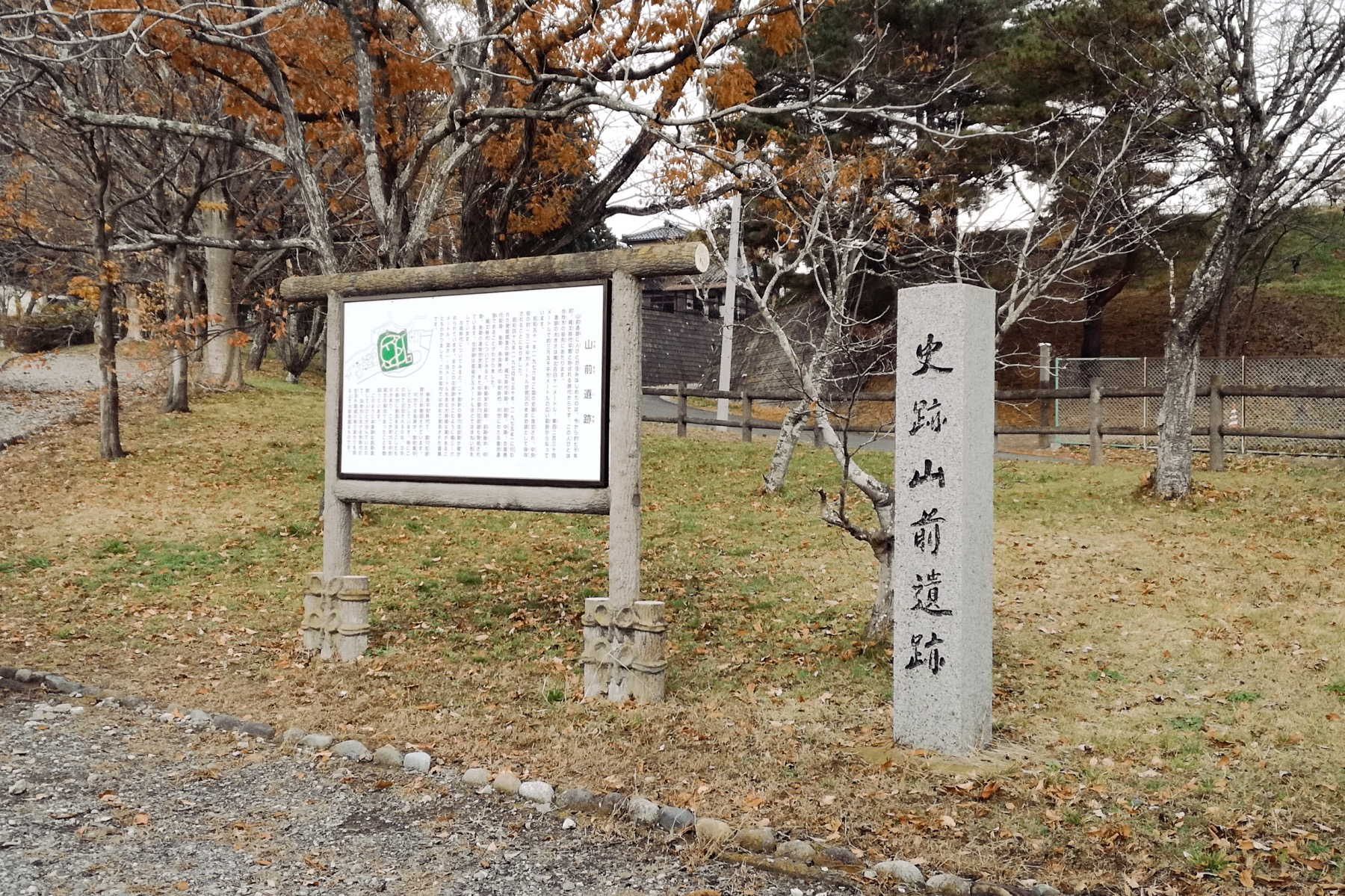
- Yamamae ruins

- Yamamae ruins Yamamae Site (Japan)
- 38°32′19″N 141°02′55″E
- Periods: Jōmon to Kofun period
- Location: Misato, Miyagi, Japan
- Region: Tōhoku region

Site notes
- Public access: Yes (park)

The Yamamae ruins (山前遺跡, Yamamae iseki) is an archaeological site located in what is now the town of Misato, Tōda District, Miyagi Prefecture in the Tōhoku region of northern Japan. The site is the ruins of a settlement with associated tombs and shell midden containing remains from the early Jōmon period through the Kofun period, indicating continuous occupation over several thousand years. It is protected by the central government as a National Historic Site.

== Overview ==
The site is located on an isolated hill with an elevation of 15–20 meters over the surrounding Ōsaki plains. Per excavations conducted in 1965, 1974 and 1975, the remains of an early to middle Jōmon period settlement were found on the southern side of the hill, with the shell midden on the eastern side. The shell midden contained shells from mostly freshwater shellfish, but also had oyster shells, despite its distance from the ocean. The settlement extended for approximately 490 meters east-west by 120 meters north-south. A number of horizontal cave tombs were also found. The top of the hill was terraced, and post holes for a 5 meter diameter pit dwelling was found near the summit. The base of the hill has moat, with a width of 5–6 meters, which indicates that the settlement was later fortified during the Kofun period. From within the moat, wooden spurs, bamboo spears and other weapons were found. number of kofun have been found in the vicinity, including the 66-meter long Kyozenizuka keyhole-shaped tomb, but are outside the limits of the designated Historic Site area. The settlement vanished sometime during the Heian period.

The site is now maintained as an archaeological park and has been opened to the public. It is about a 20-minute walk from Kogota Station on the JR East Tohoku Main Line.

== See also ==
- List of Historic Sites of Japan (Miyagi)
