= 2003 Taungdwingyi earthquake =

Earthquake in Myanmar

- Location within Myanmar
- UTC time: 2003-09-21 18:16:13
- ISC event: 7131681
- USGS-ANSS: ComCat
- Local date: 22 September 2003
- Local time: 00:46 Myanmar Standard Time
- Magnitude: 6.6 M_{wb} 6.8 M_{s}
- Depth: 10.0 km (6.2 mi)
- Epicenter: 19.917°N 95.672°E
- Fault: Gwegyo Thrust
- Type: Oblique-slip
- Areas affected: Myanmar
- Max. intensity: MMI X (Extreme)
- Landslides: Yes
- Aftershocks: Yes
- Casualties: 7–10 killed, 42 injured

The 2003 Taungdwingyi earthquake struck central Myanmar at 00:46 local time, on 22 September with a magnitude of M_{wb} 6.6.

== Geology ==
The earthquake occurred due to shallow strike-slip faulting. The source fault is located along the eastern foothills of the Pego Yoma range, and adjacent to the Sagaing Fault. Its epicenter is centered southeast of the nearby town of Taungdwingyi, at least 50 km from the Sagaing Fault and 360 km from Yangon. Shaking was felt in Bangkok and Chiang Mai. Numerous aftershocks were recorded in the region. Four of them were greater than M5.0.

== Damage and casualties ==
At least seven people were killed and 43 were injured. Damage was severe, over 180 ritual houses were destroyed, including a primary school that collapsed. Liquefaction, sand boils and landslides were also reported. The small death toll is attributed to the fact that this quake occurred around midnight, therefore the collapse of the school did not result in any injuries.

== See also ==
- List of earthquakes in 2003
- List of earthquakes in Myanmar
