= 2000 Yao'an earthquake =

5.9 Mw earthquake in Yunnan, China

- Location within Yunnan Location within China
- UTC time: 2000-01-14 23:37:07
- ISC event: 1884945
- USGS-ANSS: ComCat
- Local date: January 15, 2000
- Local time: 07:37:07 CST (UTC+10)
- Magnitude: 6.5 M_{s} 5.9 M_{w}
- Depth: 33 km (21 mi)
- Epicenter: 25.607°N 101.063°E
- Type: Strike-slip
- Areas affected: Yunnan, China
- Total damage: ¥540.2 million (US$74 million)
- Max. intensity: MMI VIII (Severe)
- Foreshocks: M_{w} 5.5 at 22:09 UTC on 14/01/2000
- Aftershocks: 3 >M_{w} 4.0 (as of 23/01/2000)
- Casualties: 7 fatalities, 2,528 injuries, 200,000 displaced

On 15 January 2000, at 07:37 CST, a M_{s} 6.5 or M_{w} 5.9 earthquake struck Yao'an County in Chuxiong Yi Autonomous Prefecture, Yunnan, China, 85 km (53 mi) east of Dali City. The earthquake was preceded by a M_{w} 5.5 foreshock at 06:09 local time.

== Tectonic setting ==
Yunnan lies within the area affected by the continuing collision between the India Plate and the Eurasian Plate which has led to the formation of the Tibetan Plateau. Lateral eastward spreading of this zone of thickened crust is impeded by the presence of the South China Block, and this causes clockwise rotation of the Sichuan–Yunnan block, accommodated by left-lateral strike-slip faults on its eastern margin and right-lateral strike-slip faults to the west.

== Earthquake ==
The earthquake sequence started with two foreshocks at 22:09 (M5.5) and 22:23 (M3.9) on January 14. The mainshock, which occurred soon afterward at 23:37, had an estimated magnitude of M_{w} 5.9 (ANSS), M_{w} 6.0, or M_{s} 6.5.

Based on the aftershock distribution, the earthquake was the result of rupture along a fault with a strike of N50°W. The causative fault was most likely the right-lateral Maweiqing fault, one of the faults that form the western boundary of the Sichuan–Yunnan block.

== Impact ==
The earthquake killed seven people and injured 2,528 others, 99 of whom were seriously injured, with 200,000 people displaced. Casualties were reduced as a foreshock forced many out of their homes before the mainshock struck shortly after. At least 659,644 homes were damaged, including 410,365 in Yao'an County and 233,165 in Dayao County; 100,000 of the affected homes were heavily damaged or destroyed. Preliminary estimates put the cost of the damage at $74 million. All 136 homes were damaged in the village of Piaolaqiao, with one-third of the village's residents facing food shortages after the quake. Overall, the earthquake affected 74 townships in seven counties within two prefectures.

== Aftermath and response ==
By 16 January, hundreds of tents had been set up for displaced residents, with 2,000 more scheduled to arrive by the next day. Soldiers had also been drafted in to help coordinate rescue efforts in Yao'an County, near the epicenter. The Hong Kong Red Cross sent 10,000 coats, 10,000 cooking sets, 5,000 quilts, and 150 packs of rice. The Salvation Army planned to deliver 2,000 sleeping bags, cotton quilts, and over 1,000 coats to Yunnan.

== See also ==
- List of earthquakes in 2000
- List of earthquakes in China
  - List of earthquakes in Yunnan
- 2003 Dayao earthquake
