= Kitaura Station (Miyagi) =

Railway station in Misato, Miyagi Prefecture, Japan

Kitaura Station 北浦駅
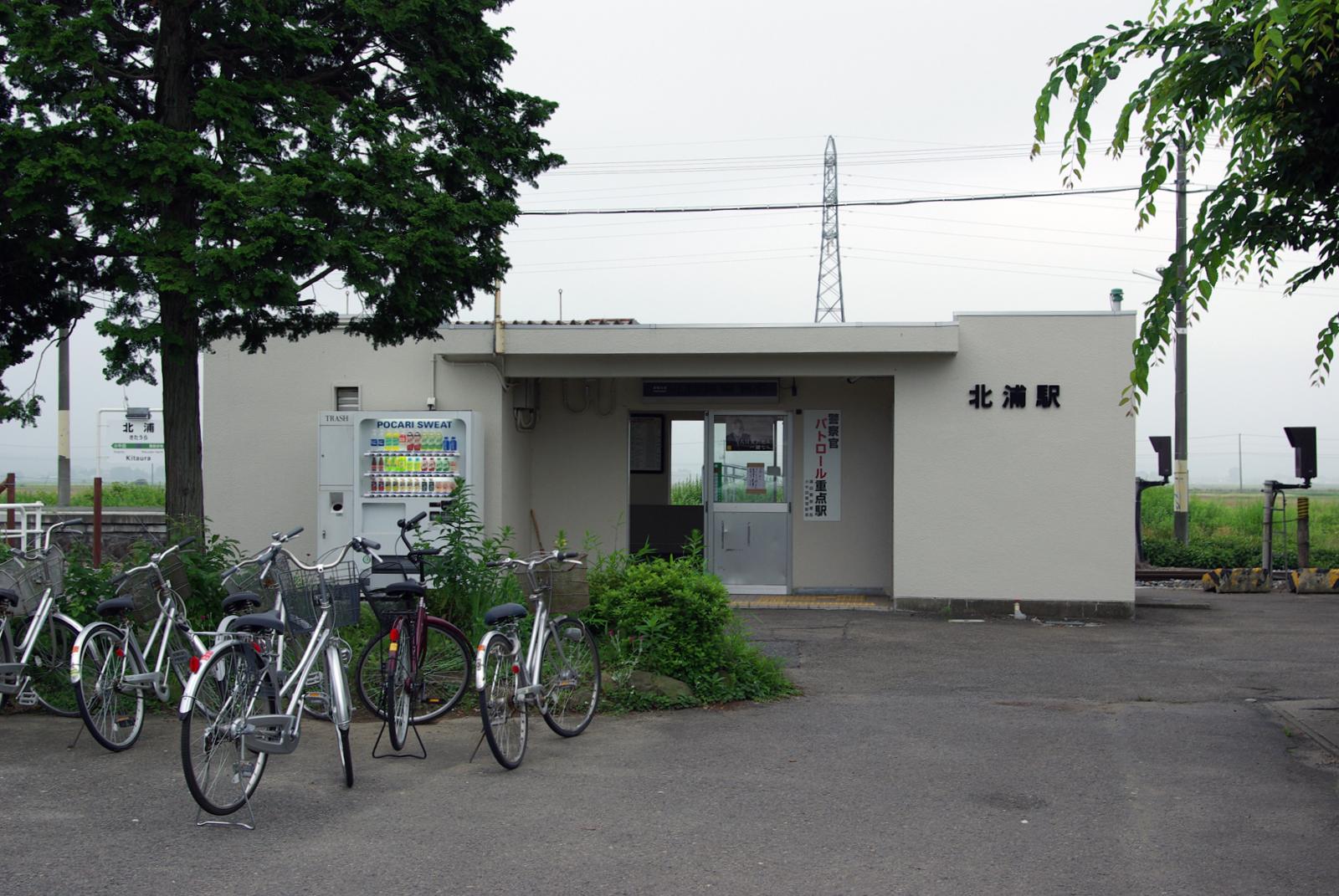
- Kitaura Station in July 2009

General information
- Location: Kitaura, Misato-machi, Tōda-gun, Miyagi-ken 987-0005; Japan
- Coordinates: 38.5601°N 141.022°E
- Operator: JR East
- Line: ■ Rikuu East Line
- Distance: 4.5 km from Kogota
- Platforms: 1 island platform
- Tracks: 2

Construction
- Structure type: At grade

Other information
- Status: Unstaffed
- Website: Official website

History
- Opened: 13 September 1914

Services
Preceding station	JR East	Following station
Rikuzen-Yachi towards Shinjō	Rikuu East Line	Kogota Terminus
Location
- Location within Miyagi Prefecture Location within Japan

Kitaura Station (北浦駅, Kitaura-eki) is a railway station in the town of Misato, Miyagi Prefecture, Japan, operated by East Japan Railway Company (JR East).

== Lines ==
Kitaura Station is served by the Rikuu East Line, and is located 4.5 rail kilometers from the terminus of the line at Kogota Station.

== Station layout ==
The station has one island platform, connected to the station building by a level crossing. The station is unattended.

=== Platforms ===
1	■ Rikuu East Line	for Kogota
2	■ Rikuu East Line	for Furukawa and Naruko-Onsen

== History ==
Kitaura Station opened on 13 September 1914. The station was absorbed into the JR East network upon the privatization of JNR on 1 April 1987.

== Surrounding area ==
- National Route 108
- Kitaura Station Post Office

== See also ==
- List of railway stations in Japan
