= Rikuzen-Yachi Station =

Railway station in Misato, Miyagi Prefecture, Japan

Rikuzen-Yachi Station 陸前谷地駅
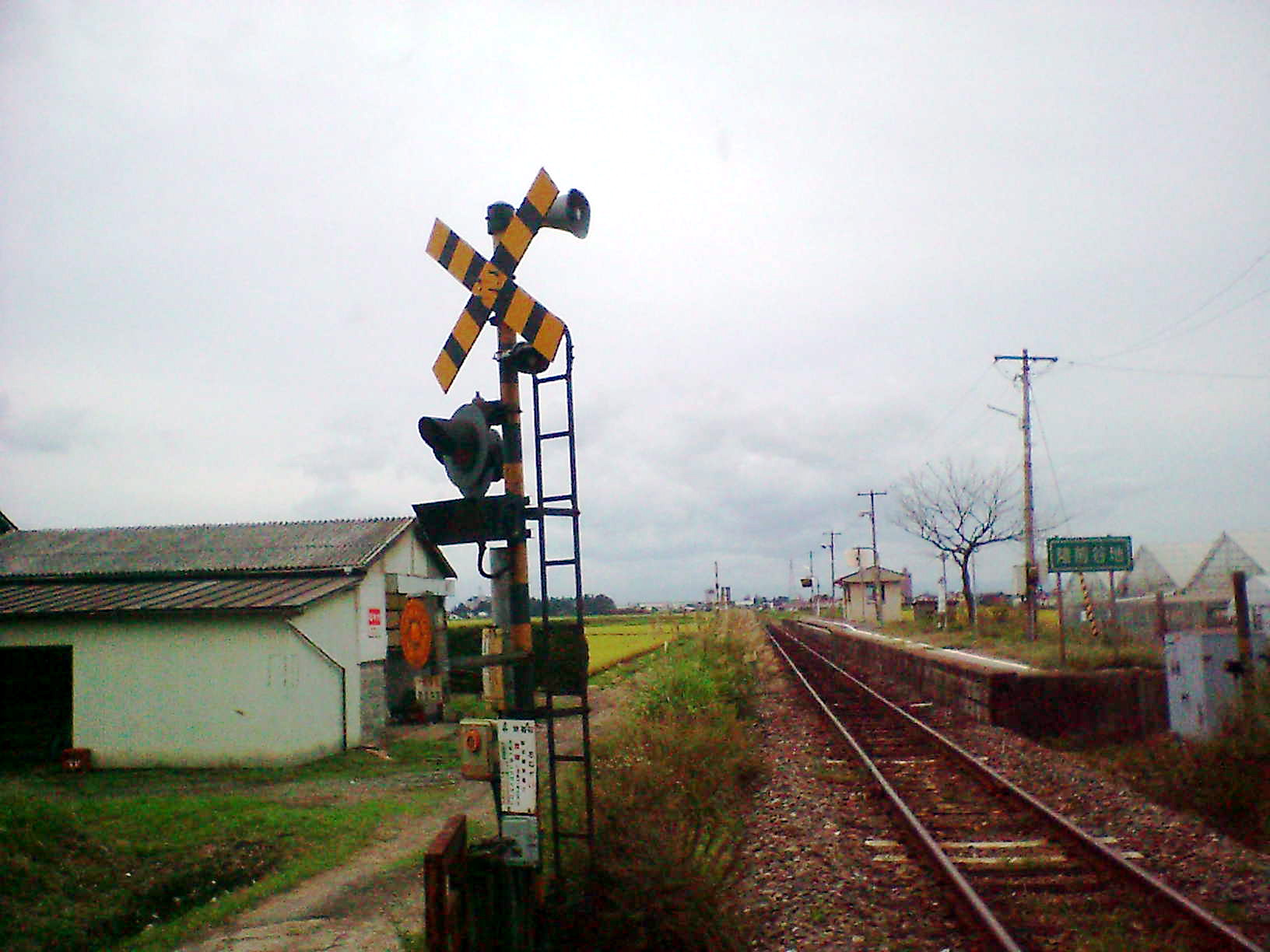
- Rikuzen-Yachi Station in September 2005

General information
- Location: Kitaura-yachi, Misato-machi, Tōda-gun, Miyagi-ken 987-0005; Japan
- Coordinates: 38.5653°N 140.9994°E
- Operator: JR East
- Line: ■ Rikuu East Line
- Distance: 6.6 km from Kogota
- Platforms: 1 side platform
- Tracks: 1

Construction
- Structure type: At grade

Other information
- Status: Unstaffed
- Website: Official website

History
- Opened: 13 August 1960

Services
Preceding station	JR East	Following station
Furukawa towards Shinjō	Rikuu East Line	Kitaura towards Kogota
Location
- Location within Miyagi Prefecture Location within Japan

Rikuzen-Yachi Station (陸前谷地駅, Rikuzen-Yachi-eki) is a railway station in the town of Misato, Miyagi Prefecture, Japan, operated by East Japan Railway Company (JR East).

== Lines ==
Rikuzen-Yachi Station is served by the Rikuu East Line, and is located 6.6 rail kilometers from the terminus of the line at Kogota Station.

== Station layout ==
The station has one side platform, serving a single bi-directional track. The station is unattended.

== History ==
Rikuzen-Yachi Station opened on 13 August 1960. The station was absorbed into the JR East network upon the privatization of JNR on 1 April 1987.

== Surrounding area ==
- National Route 108

== See also ==
- List of railway stations in Japan
