= Kuray Mountains =

Mountain range in the Altai Republic in Russia

- Курайский хребет
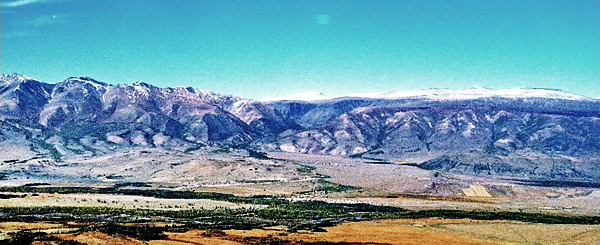

Highest point
- Peak: Tydtuyaryk
- Elevation: 3,367 m (11,047 ft)
- Prominence: 936 m (3,071 ft)

Geography
- Location within Altai Republic
- Location: Altai Republic, Russia
- Range coordinates: 50°18′N 88°20′E
- Parent range: Altai Mountains; South Siberian Mountains

The Kuray Mountains are a mountain range in the Altai Republic, Russia.

== Description ==
Bounded to the south by the Kuray and Chuya Basins, the Kuray mountains form the northern part of a metamorphic dome complex. The highest peak is Tydtuyaryk at 3,367 metres (11,000 ft).

Major rivers flow from the Kuray mountains predominantly to the north, where they continue for several hundred kilometres through the northern Altai Mountains, passing through Lake Teletskoye.

== See also ==
- List of mountains and hills of Russia
