= 2003 Bachu earthquake =

Earthquake in Xinjiang, China

- Location within Xinjiang Location within China
- UTC time: 2003-02-24 02:03:41
- ISC event: 6593974
- USGS-ANSS: ComCat
- Local date: 24 February 2003
- Local time: 10:03
- Magnitude: M_{s} 6.8; M_{w} 6.3
- Depth: 11 kilometres (6.8 mi)
- Epicenter: 39.610°N 77.230°E
- Areas affected: Xinjiang, China
- Max. intensity: MMI IX (Violent)
- Casualties: 268 fatalities, 4,853 injuries

The 2003 Bachu earthquake occurred on 24 February at 10:03 local time in the Xinjiang Autonomous Region in northwest China. The epicenter was located near to the town of Jiashi and Bachu County, approximately 105 km east of Kashgar and 310 km west of Aksu.

== Tectonic setting ==
Seismic activity is common in the Bachu and the surrounding area. It occurs as a result of movement on fault systems that bound the Tien Shan mountain belt. The Tien Shan is actively evolving, as a result of far-field stresses associated with the collision of India and Eurasia. According to the moment tensor solution, the earthquake occurred on a thrust fault that dips 6° to the north, and strikes approximately east–west. Such a gentle dip angle implies that the earthquake may have occurred on or just above the basal detachment of the neighbouring fold-thrust belts. There is no evidence of oblique-slip or strike-slip movement.

== Damage and casualties ==
The earthquake killed 268 people and injured 4,853 others, 2,058 of them seriously. The counties of Bachu, Jiashi, Artux and Makit, as well as the city of Kashgar were the worst-affected areas. According to Xinhua News Agency, the quake was the most serious in the area since 1949. In the town of Chongku Qiake, the worst hit town in Bachu, every house was damaged, leaving 90 percent of the population without shelter. Most of the casualties occurred in the county, where more than 158 were killed including the elderly and children. Around 12 children in a secondary school were killed when their school collapsed. Two bodies of children were found in a primary school. Almost 71,000 homes were levelled and 40,119 others were damaged by the earthquake.

== See also ==
- List of earthquakes in 2003
- List of earthquakes in China
