= Misato, Miyagi =

Misato 美里町
- Town
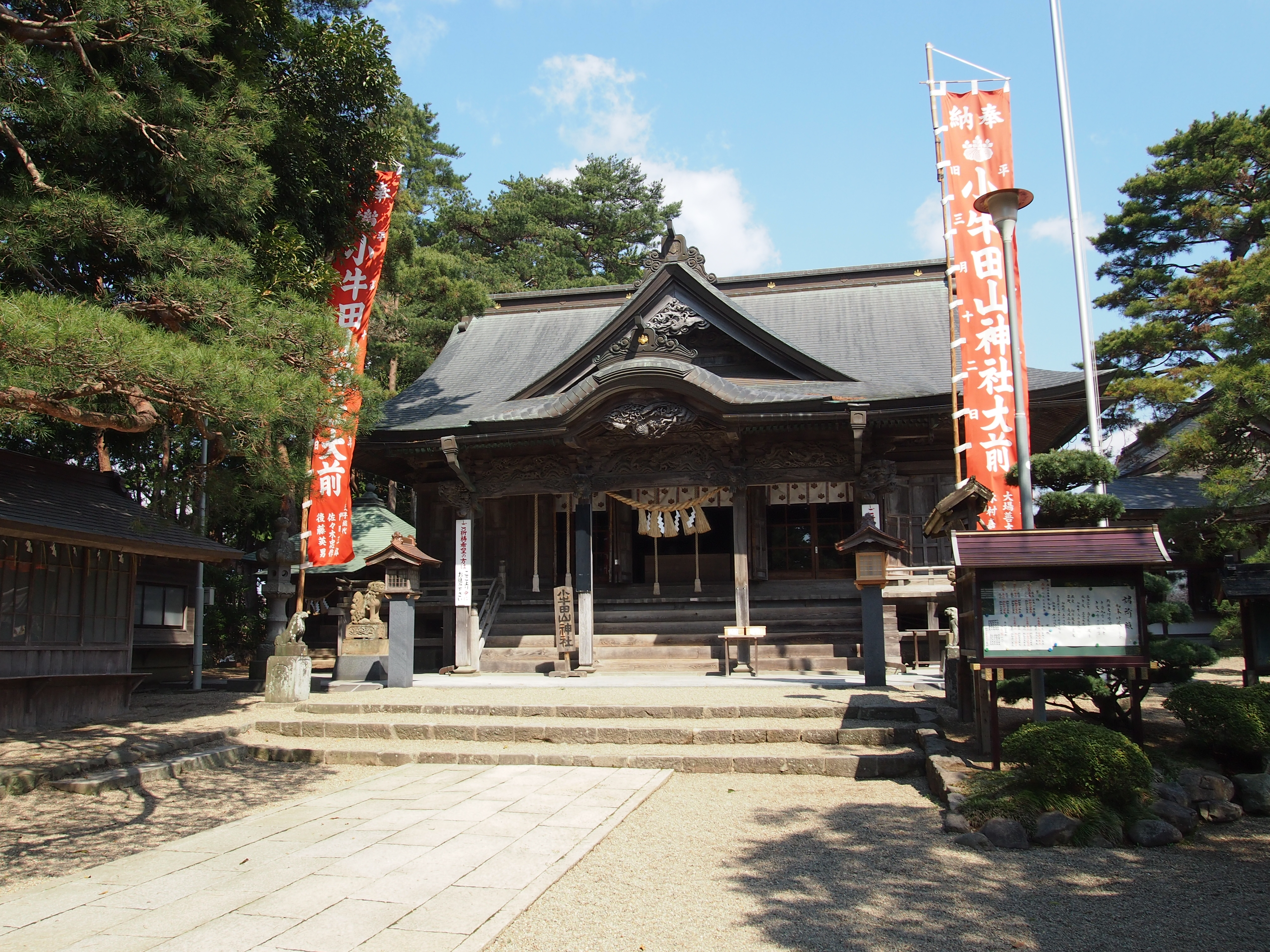
- Kogota Yamanokami Shrine

- Flag Seal

- Location of Misato in Miyagi Prefecture

- Coordinates: 38°32′39.8″N 141°03′24.1″E
- Country: Japan
- Region: Tōhoku
- Prefecture: Miyagi
- District: Tōda

Area
  - Total: 74.95 km^{2} (28.94 sq mi)

Population (April 1, 2020)
  - Total: 24,565
  - Density: 327.8/km^{2} (848.9/sq mi)
- Time zone: UTC+9 (Japan Standard Time)
- Tree: Flowering Dogwood
- Flower: Rose
- Phone number: 0229-43-2111
- Address: 13-banchi Kitaura Komagome, Misato-chō, Tōda-gun, Miyagi-ken 987-0005
- Website: Official website

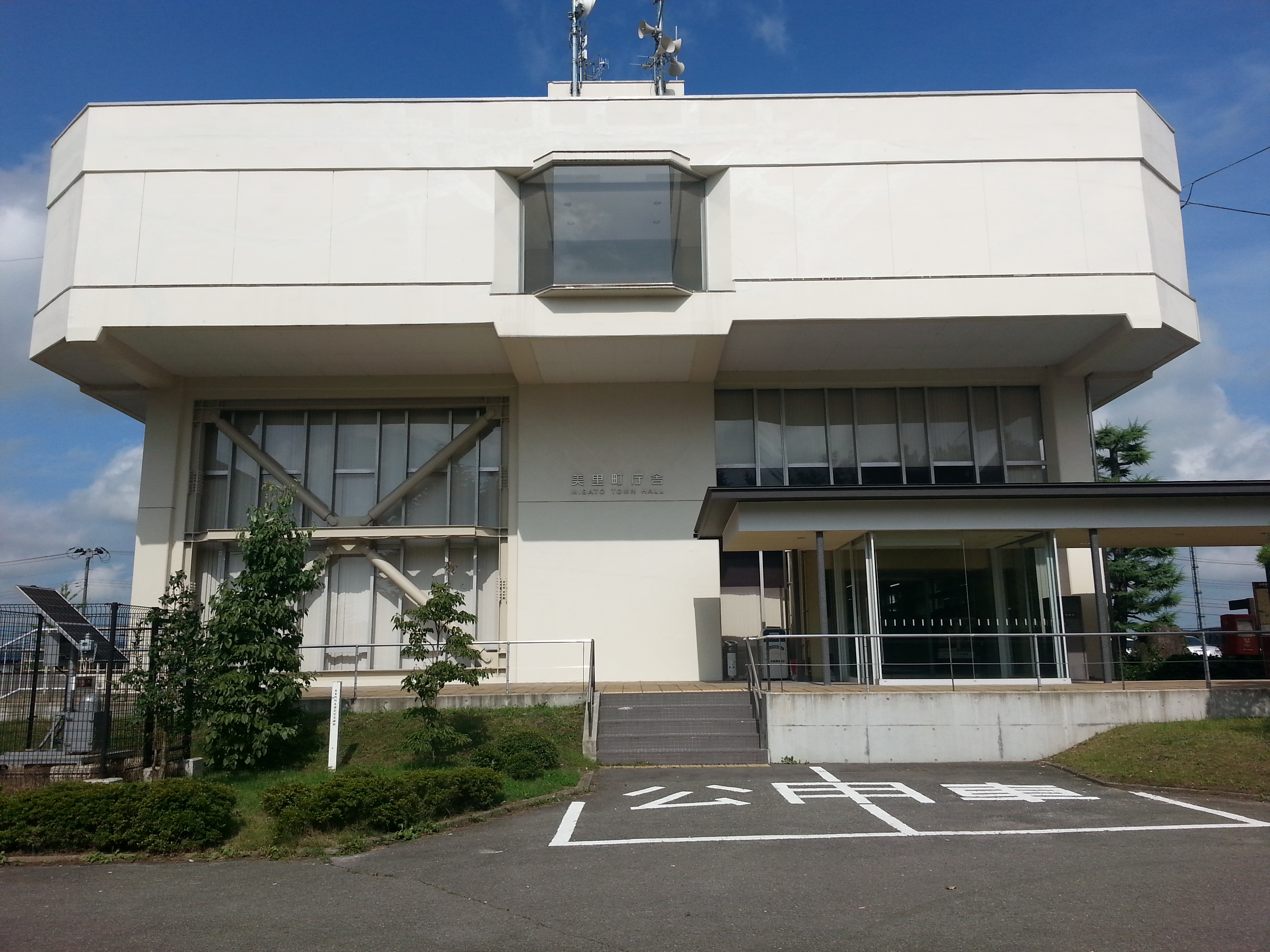
Misato town hall

Misato (美里町, Misato-machi) is a town located in Miyagi Prefecture, Japan. As of 1 April 2020, the town had an estimated population of 24,565 in 9109 households, and a population density of 330 persons per km^{2}. The total area of the town is 74.95 square kilometres (28.94 sq mi).

== Geography ==
Misato is located in north-central Miyagi Prefecture in the flatlands of the Ōsaki Plains.

=== Neighboring municipalities ===
Miyagi Prefecture

- Ishinomaki
- Higashimatsushima
- Matsushima
- Ōsaki
- Wakuya

=== Climate ===
Misato has a humid subtropical climate (Köppen climate classification Cfa) characterized by mild summers and cold winters. The average annual temperature in Misato is 11.6 °C. The average annual rainfall is 1210 mm with September as the wettest month. The temperatures are highest on average in August, at around 24.4 °C, and lowest in January, at around -0.1 °C.

== Demographics ==
Per Japanese census data, the population of Misato has started to decline after the year 2000.

Historical population
Year	Pop.	±%
1960	28,793	—
1970	26,722	−7.2%
1980	28,152	+5.4%
1990	28,164	+0.0%
2000	27,395	−2.7%
2010	25,190	−8.0%
2020	24,565	−2.5%

== History ==
The area of present-day Misato was part of ancient Mutsu Province, and has been settled since at least the Jōmon period by the Emishi people. During the Kofun period, a settlement existed in what later became the village of Kogota. During later portion of the Heian period, the area was ruled by the Northern Fujiwara. During the Sengoku period, the area was contested by various samurai clans before it came under the control of the Date clan of Sendai Domain during the Edo period, under the Tokugawa shogunate.

The villages of Kogota and Nangō were established on June 1, 1889, with the establishment of the modern municipalities system. Kogota was raised to town status on April 1, 1907. It annexed the town of Fudodo and the villages of Kitaura and Nakazone on April 1, 1954, and the village of Shikitama on August 1, 1954. Nangō was raised to town status on July 1, 1954. Misato was formed on January 1, 2006, by the merger of the towns of Kogota and Nangō.

== Government ==
Misato has a mayor-council form of government with a directly elected mayor and a unicameral town council of 16 members. Misato and the neighboring town of Wakuya together contribute one seat to the Miyagi Prefectural legislature. In terms of national politics, the town is part of Miyagi 5th district of the lower house of the Diet of Japan.

== Economy ==
The economy of Misato is largely based on agriculture, primarily the cultivation of rice.

== Education ==
Misato has six public elementary schools and three public junior high schools operated by the town government and two public high schools operated by the Miyagi Prefectural Board of Education. The prefecture also operates two special education schools for the handicapped.

== Transportation ==
=== Railway ===
East Japan Railway Company (JR East) - Tōhoku Main Line

- Kogota

East Japan Railway Company (JR East) - Ishinomaki Line

- Kogota

East Japan Railway Company (JR East) - Rikuu East Line

- Kogota - Kitaura - Rikuzen-Yachi

=== Highway ===
- National Route 108
- National Route 346

== International relations ==
- Changqing District, Jinan, Shandong Province, China
- (United States) Winona, Minnesota, USA

== Local attractions ==
- Yamamae Site, National Historic Site

== Noted people from Misato ==
- Hiroshi Mitsuzuka, politician and cabinet minister
