= Yakhak, Afghanistan =

Yakhak یخک
- Village
- Location within Afghanistan
- Coordinates: 34°37′N 63°15′E
- Country: Afghanistan
- Province: Herat
- Time zone: + 4.30

Yakhak (Dari: یخک) is a village in Herat Province in northwestern Afghanistan.

== See also ==
- Herat Province
