= Fissure =

Long, narrow crack opening on a planetary surface

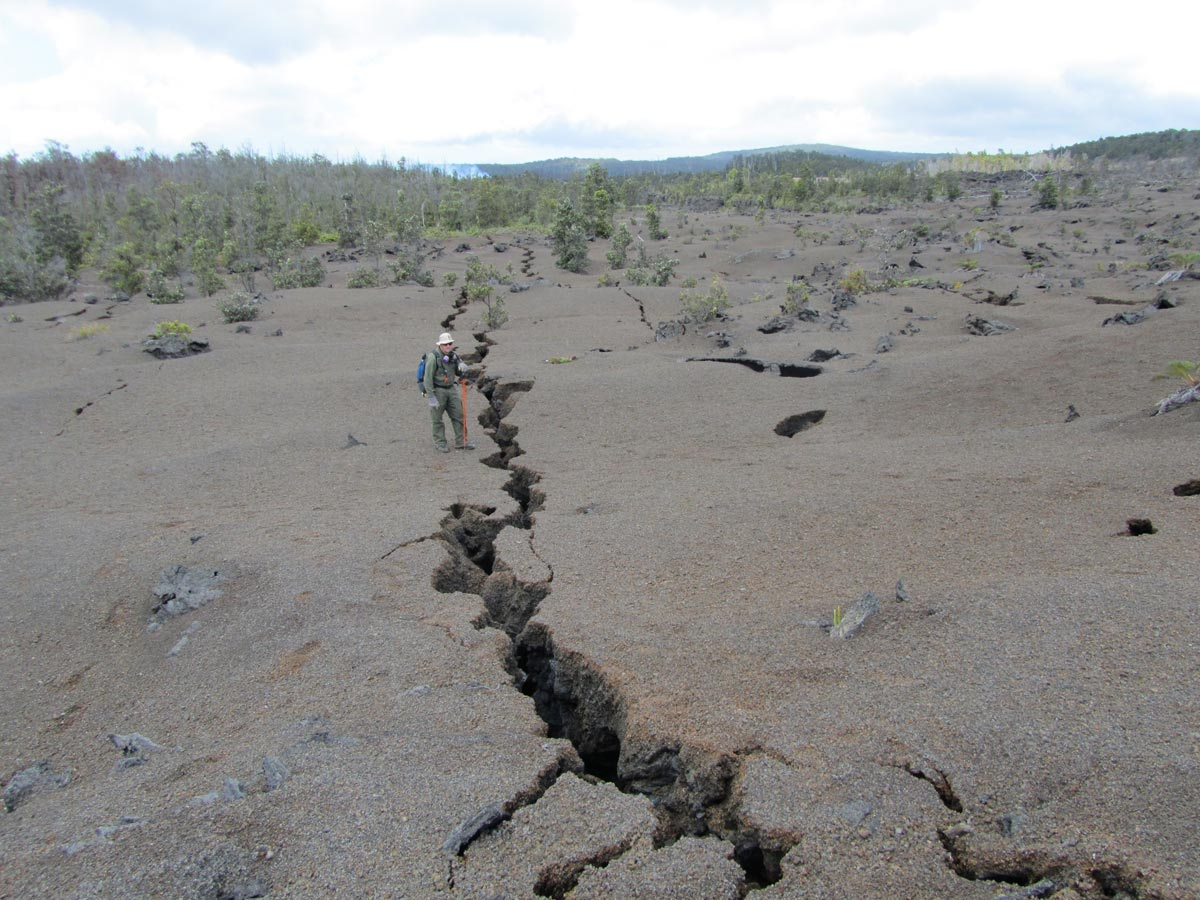
Ground cracks at an east–west segment of Kamoamoa after its 2011 fissure eruption. The geologist is about 180 cm (5.9 ft) tall.

A fissure is a long, narrow crack opening along the surface of Earth. The term is derived from the Latin word fissura, which means 'cleft' or 'crack'. Fissures emerge in Earth's crust, on ice sheets and glaciers, and on volcanoes.

== Ground fissure ==
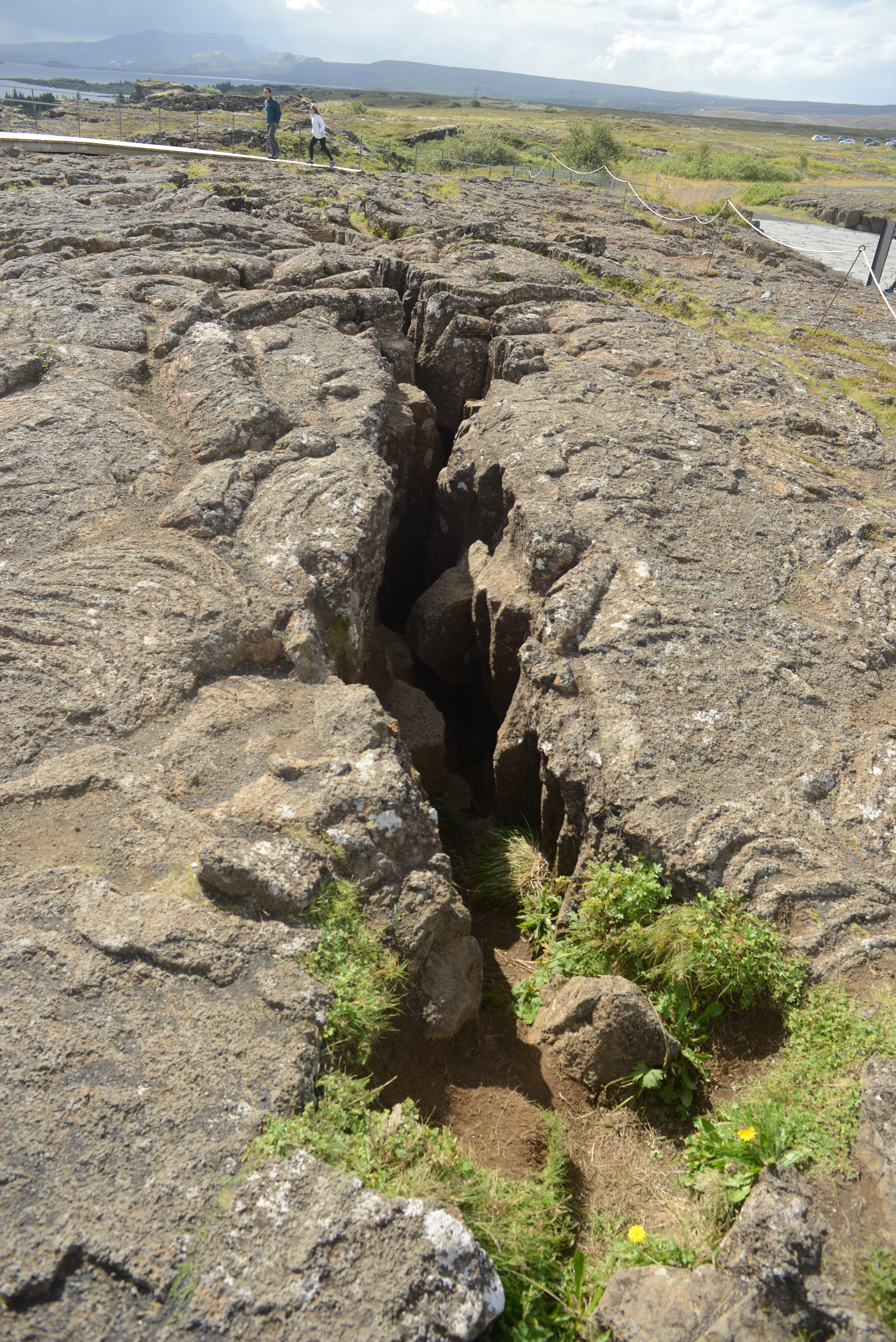
A fissure in the lava field of Þingvellir National Park, Iceland

A ground fissure, also called an earth fissure, is a long, narrow crack or linear opening in the Earth's crust. Ground fissures can form naturally, such as from tectonic faulting and earthquakes, or as a consequence of human activity, such as oil mining and groundwater pumping. Once formed, ground fissures can be extended and eroded by torrential rain. They can be hazardous to people and livestock living on the affected surfaces and damaging to property and infrastructure, such as roads, underground pipes, canals, and dams.

In circumstances where there is the extensive withdrawal of groundwater, the earth above the water table can subside causing fissures to form at the surface. This typically occurs at the floor of arid valleys having rock formations and compacted soils with a high percentage of fine-grained material.

== Crevasse ==
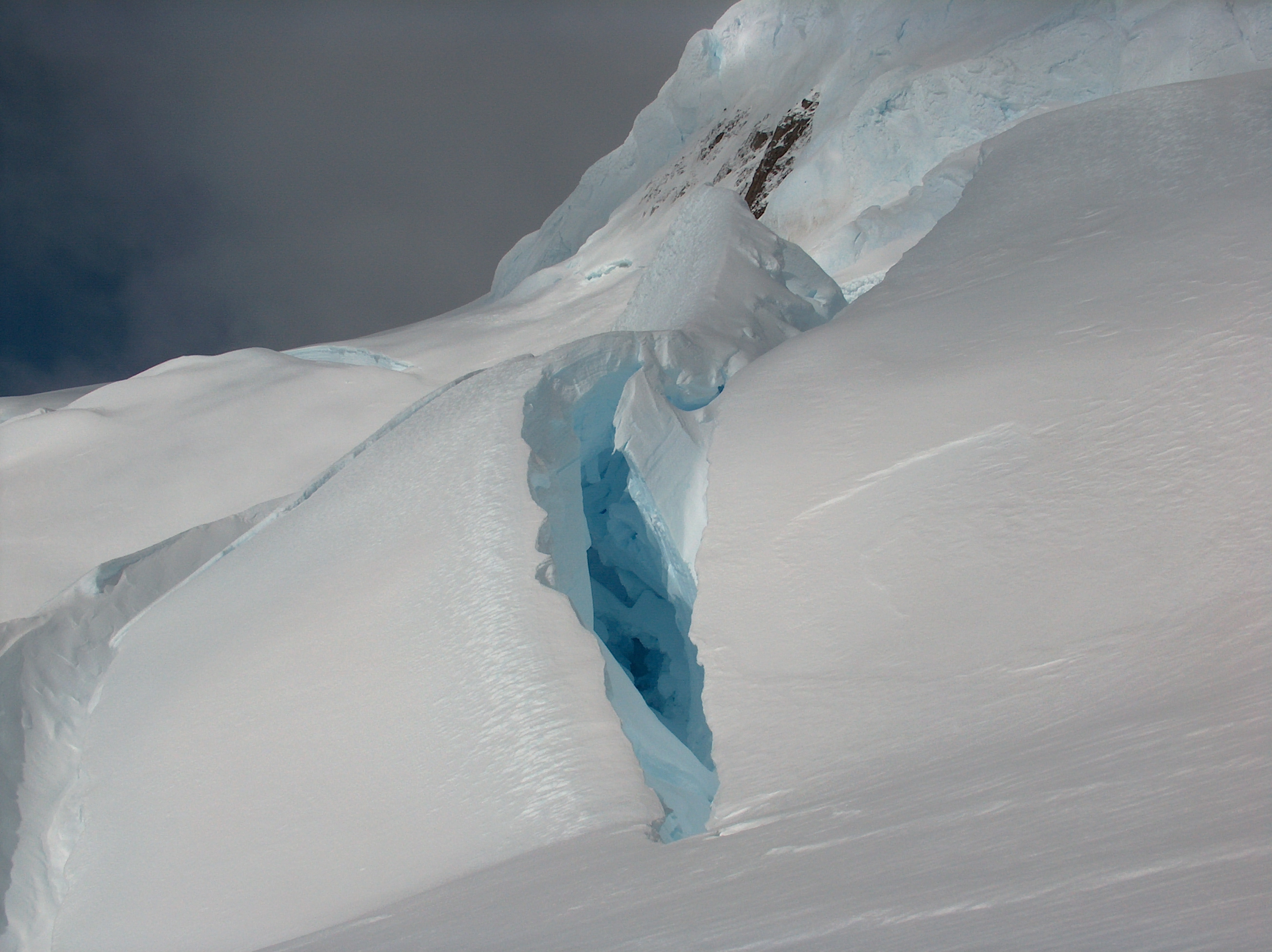
A crevasse in the Tangra Mountains, Antarctica

A crevasse, also called an ice fissure, is a deep linear crack in an ice sheet or glacier resulting from the opposing force produced by their movement at different rates of speed. The force builds until their associated shear stress is sufficient to break the ice along the faces. The breakage often forms vertical or near-vertical walls, which can melt and create seracs, arches, and other ice formations. A crevasse may be as deep as 45 m (148 ft) and as wide as 20 m (66 ft). A crevasse may be covered, but not necessarily filled, by a snow bridge made of the previous years' accumulation and snow drifts. The result is that crevasses are rendered invisible, and extremely dangerous to anyone attempting to traverse a glacier.

=== Types of crevasses ===
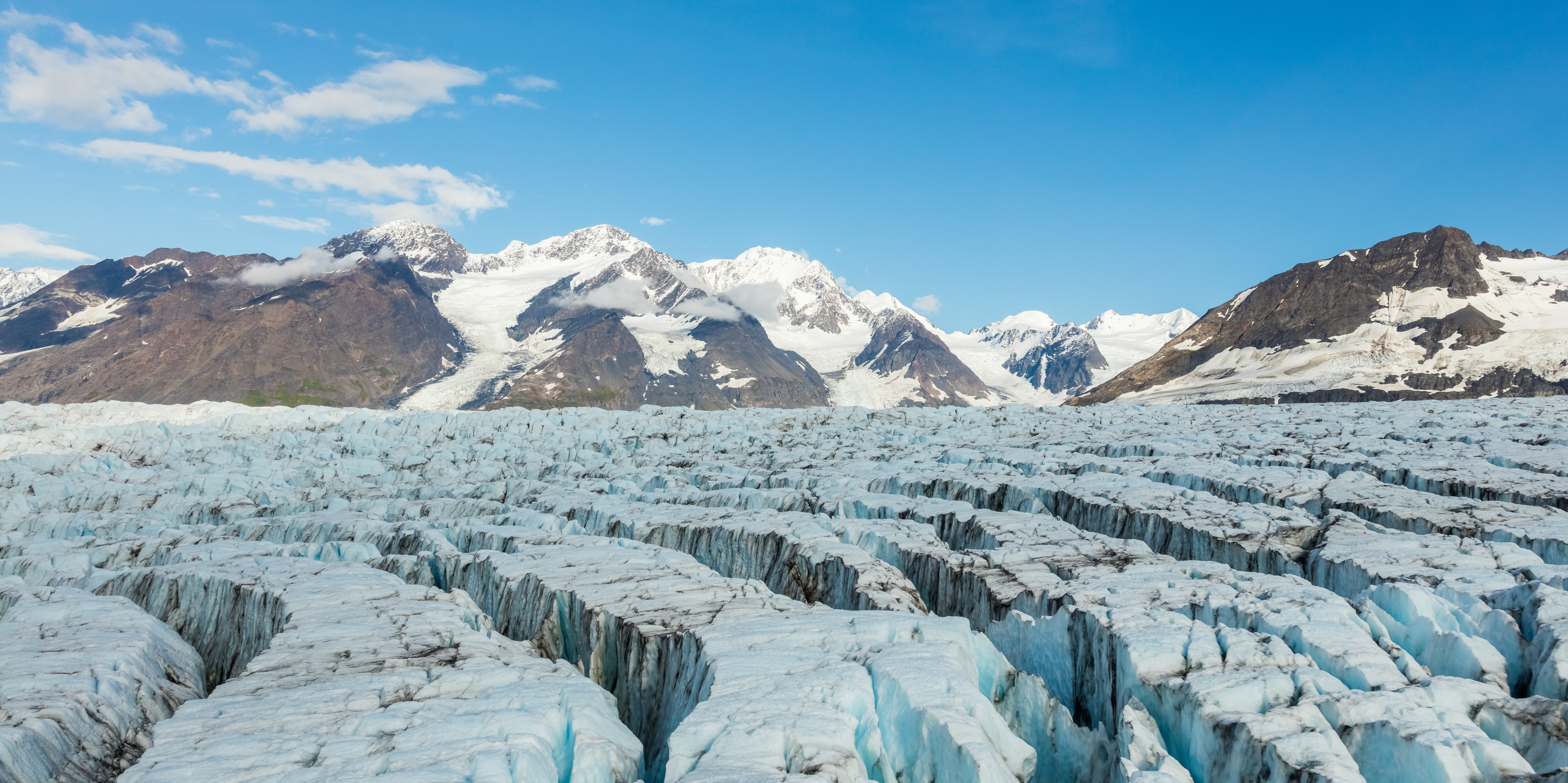
Transverse crevasses in Chugach State Park, Alaska

- Longitudinal crevasses form parallel to the ice flow where the glacier width is expanding.
- Splaying crevasses appear along the edges of a glacier.
- Transverse crevasses form in a zone of longitudinal extension where the principal stresses are parallel to the direction of glacier flow.

== Fissure vent ==
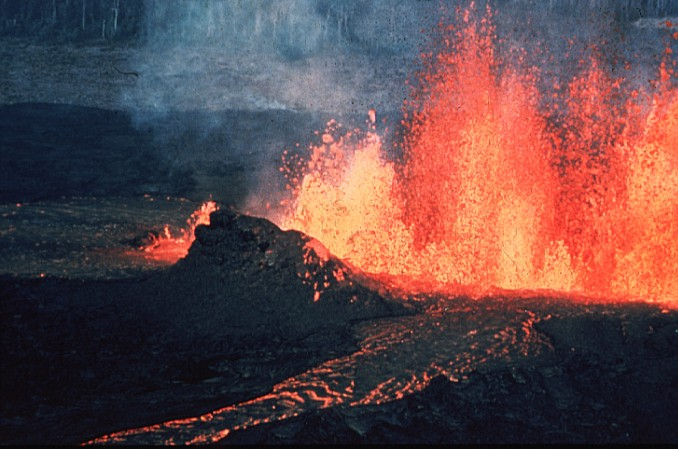
A volcanic fissure and lava channel

A fissure vent, also known as a volcanic fissure or eruption fissure, is a long volcanic vent through which lava erupts. Fissure vents are connected to deep magma reservoirs and are typically found in and along rifts and rift zones. They are commonly associated with shield volcanoes. Over time fissure vents form spatter cones and can feed lava channels and lava tubes.

== Karst terrain ==
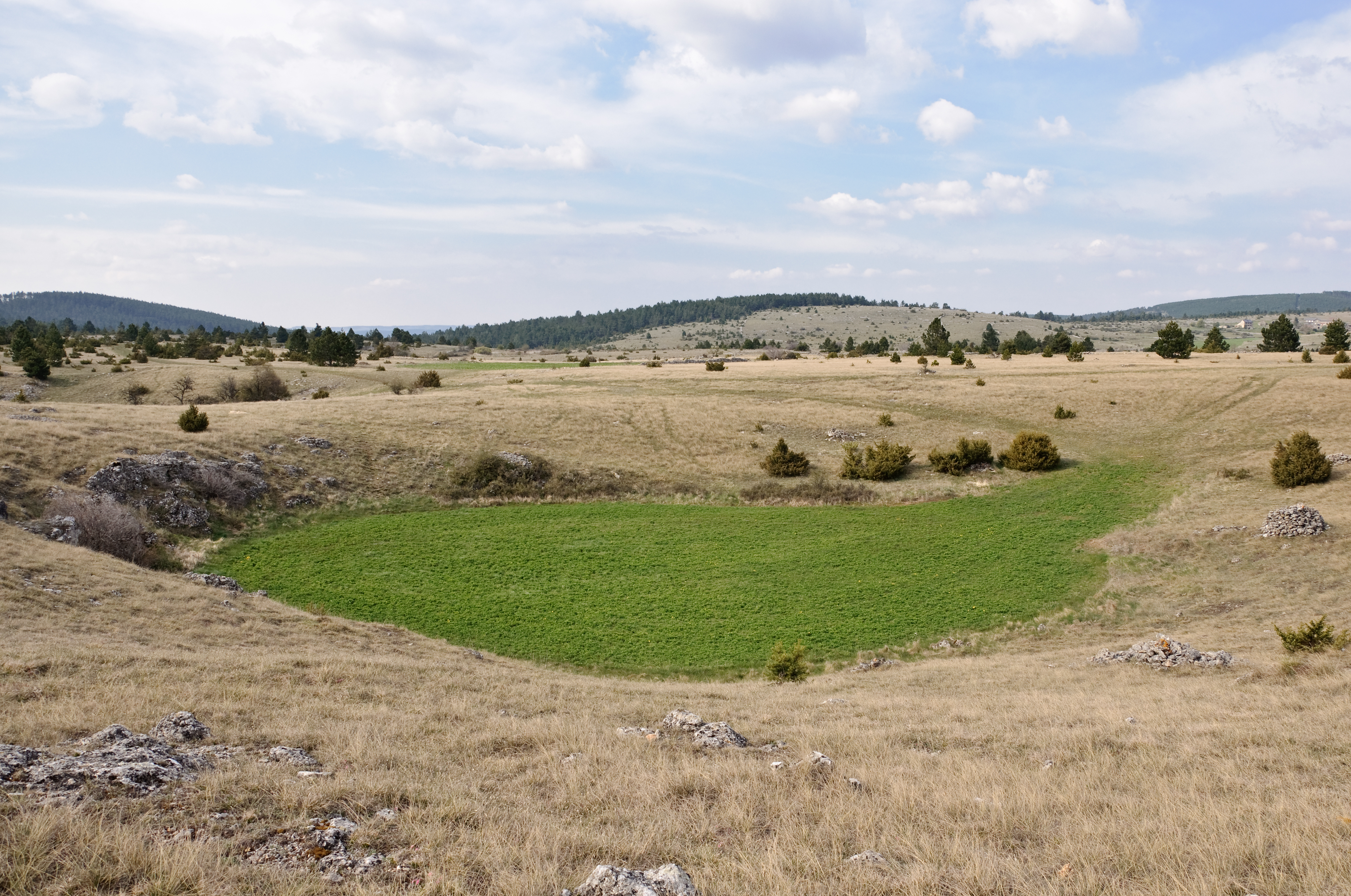
Doline in the causse de Sauveterre, Lozère, France

Karst terrain or simply karst are vast regions of barren land with rocky ground and generally consisting of nearby caves, fissured ground, and sinkholes. Although these regions normally have moderate to heavy rainfall, they are noticeably devoid of vegetation and characteristically have no lakes, rivers, or streams on their surface. They form when large to massive veins of soluble aggregate like limestone, gypsum, or dolomite are excavated by underground torrents of flowing water.

=== Karst aquifers ===
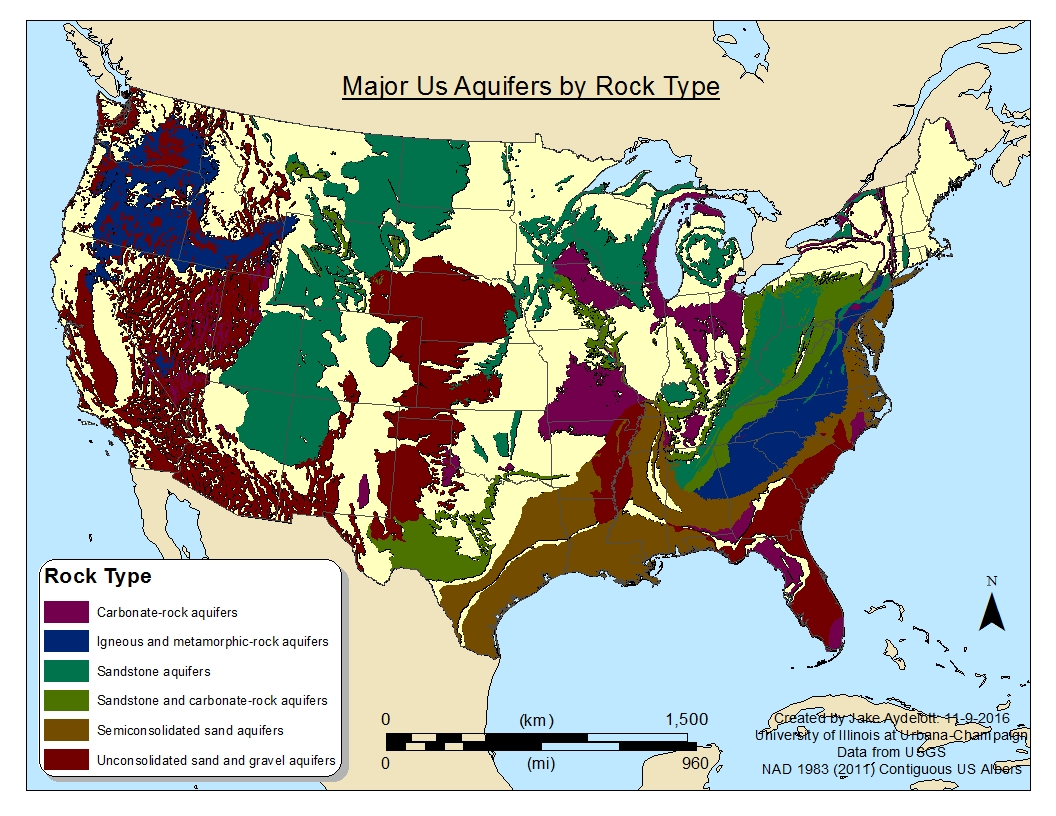
Map of major US aquifers by rock type

In the United States, about 40% of the groundwater used for drinking comes from karst aquifers. Some of these areas are well known vacation destinations like Carlsbad Caverns and Mammoth Cave. Karst aquifers are a vital resource in the US; about 20 percent of the land surface in the US is classified as karst. Other parts of the world with large areas of karst include the Caribbean, China, and Australia.

Typical karst hydrogeology consists of a network of interconnected fissures, fractures, and conduits emplaced within permeable rock. Most of the groundwater flow occurs through a network of openings, while groundwater is held in storage within the geological structures themselves.

== See also ==
- Fabric (geology)
- Fissure vein
- Thermokarst
- Topography
