= Kesennuma Line BRT and Ōfunato Line BRT =

Bus routes in Japan

Kesennuma Line BRT
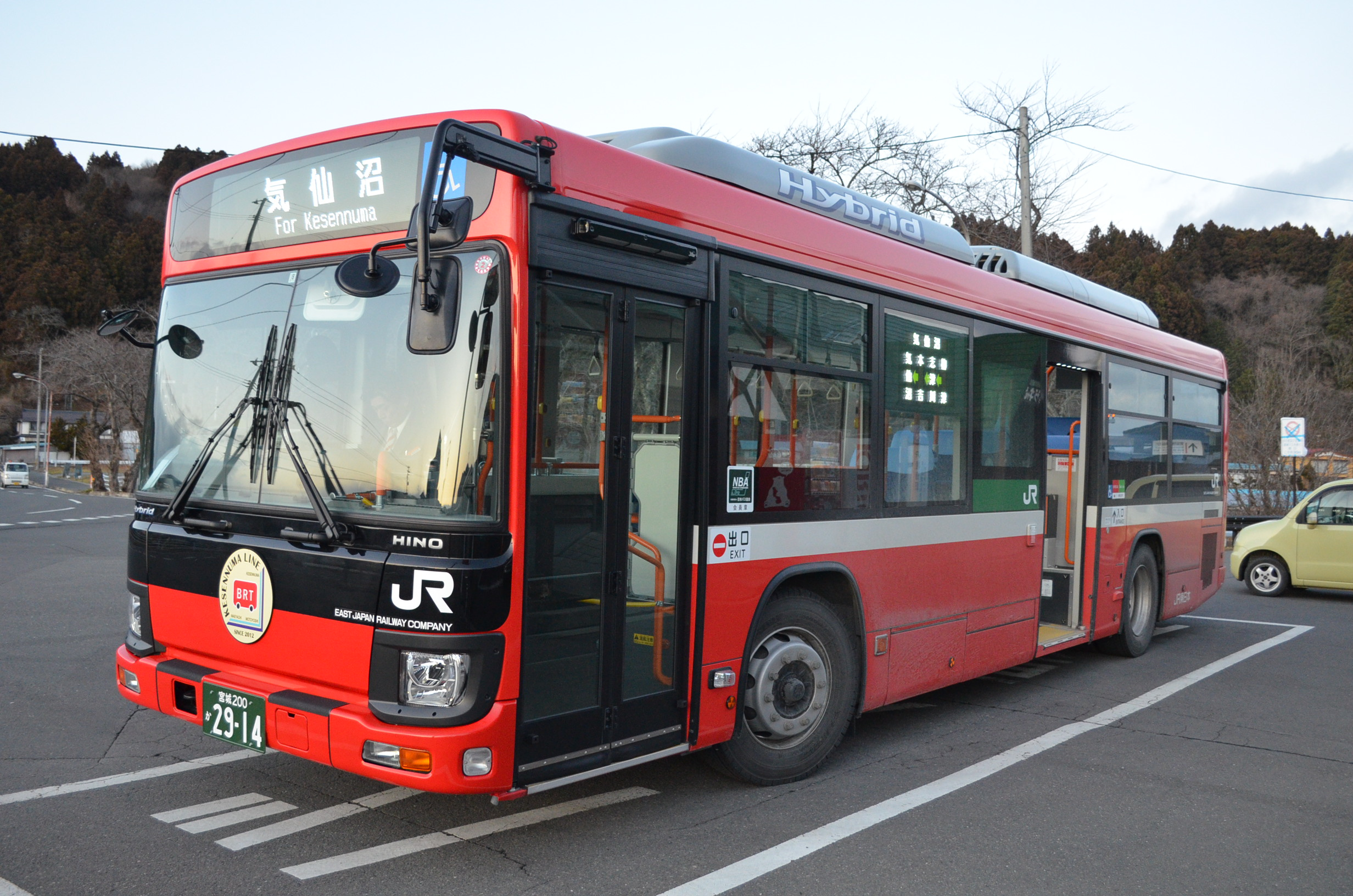

Overview
- Operator: East Japan Railway Company
- Began service: August 20, 2012; 14 years ago

Route
- Route type: Bus rapid transit
- Locale: Iwate Prefecture, Miyagi Prefecture
- Start: Maeyachi Station
- End: Kesennuma Station
- Length: 72.8 km (45.2 mi)
- Stops: 26

Ōfunato Line BRT
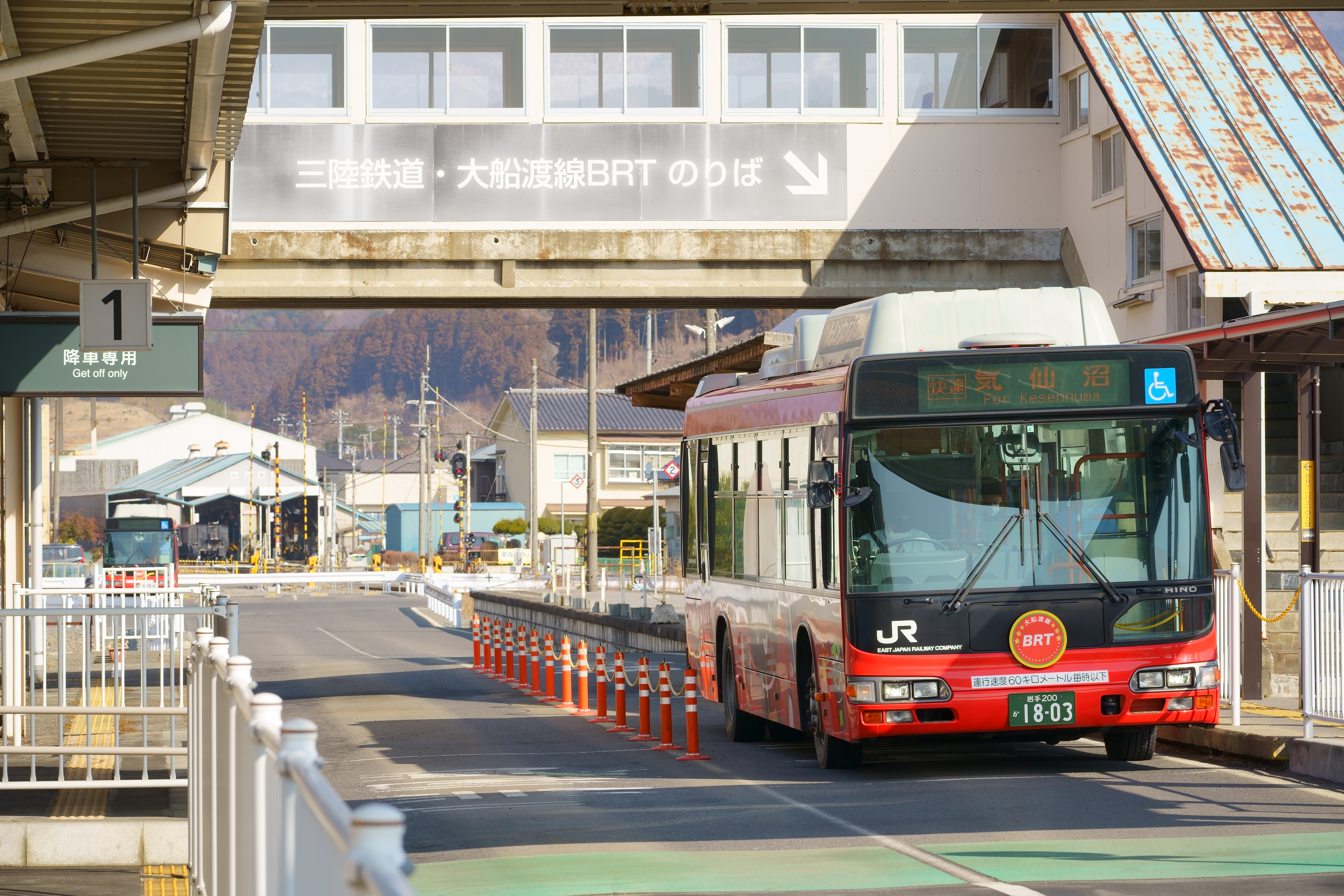

Overview
- Operator: East Japan Railway Company
- Began service: March 2, 2013; 13 years ago

Route
- Route type: Bus rapid transit
- Locale: Iwate Prefecture, Miyagi Prefecture
- Start: Kesennuma Station
- End: Sakari Station
- Length: 43.7 km (27.2 mi)
- Stops: 26

The Kesennuma Line BRT (気仙沼線BRT, Kesennuma-sen BRT) and Ōfunato Line BRT (大船渡線BRT, Ōfunato-sen BRT) are a bus rapid transit line in Iwate Prefecture and Miyagi Prefecture, Japan, operated by the East Japan Railway Company (JR East).

== History ==
=== Kesennuma Line BRT ===
Originally a railway from end to end, the line was severely damaged by the 2011 Tōhoku earthquake and tsunami, with tracks, stations, and railway bridges between Minami-Kesennuma Station and Rikuzen-Togura Station sustaining major damage. Destroyed stations included Minami-Kesennuma (except for the platform) and Shizugawa Station, as well as various others. As a result of the catastrophic damage to the line and prohibitive costs of restoration as a railway, JR East officially proposed the line's conversion into a dedicated bus rapid transit route on 27 December 2011. The buses have been Level 2 self-driving since December 2022.

=== Ōfunato Line BRT ===
The eastern section of the Ōfunato Line, a railway line operated by East Japan Railway Company, suffered severe damage in the 2011 Tōhoku earthquake and tsunami. Although other sections of the line resumed operation in January 2012, the eastern section between Kesennuma and Sakari remained closed, and in February 2012, JR East formally proposed to close this section and utilize the site as a bus rapid transit (BRT) line.

The first section of the busway replacing the Kesennuma – Sakari section opened in March 2013.

== Station list ==
- Express trains do not stop at station “○”.
- Light green (■) indicates a dedicated road section, and light blue (■) indicates a general road section.
- The ^{＋} in the station name indicates a new station after BRT conversion.

=== Kesennuma Line ===
Station name	Distance (km) from		Via Akaiwaminato	Via Kesennuma City Hospital	Connections	Location
Station name	previous station	Maeyachi	Via Akaiwaminato	Via Kesennuma City Hospital	Connections	Location
Maeyachi Station	-	(-17.5)	●		Ishinomaki Line, Kesennuma Line	Ishinomaki
Yanaizu Station	17.5	0.0	●		Kesennuma Line	Tome
Rikuzen-Yokoyama Station	4.8	4.8	●			Tome
Rikuzen-Togura Station	7.2	12.0	●			Minamisanriku
Shizugawa Station	4.2	16.2	●			Minamisanriku
Minami-Sanriku Town Office·Hospital Station^{＋}	0.8	17.0	○			Minamisanriku
Shizugawa-Chūōdanchi Station^{＋}	1.1	18.1	○			Minamisanriku
Shizuhama Station	2.6	20.7	●			Minamisanriku
Utatsu Station	4.1	24.8	●			Minamisanriku
Rikuzen-Minato Station	2.6	27.4	●			Minamisanriku
Kurauchi Station	1.8	29.2	●			Kesennuma
Rikuzen-Koizumi Station	2.0	31.2	●			Kesennuma
Motoyoshi Station	2.8	34.0	●	●		Kesennuma
Koganezawa Station	3.1	37.1	●	●		Kesennuma
Ōyakaigan Station	3.7	40.8	●	●		Kesennuma
Ōyamachi Station^{＋}	1.1	41.9	●	●		Kesennuma
Rikuzen-Hashikami Station	2.2	44.1	●	●		Kesennuma
Saichi Station	1.7	45.8	●	●		Kesennuma
Iwatsuki Station^{＋}	1.0	46.8	●	●		Kesennuma
Matsuiwa Station	1.3	48.1	●	●		Kesennuma
Akaiwaminato Station^{＋}	1.3	49.4	●	∥		Kesennuma
Kesennuma City Hospital Station^{＋}	0.3	49.7	∥	●		Kesennuma
Minami-Kesennuma Station	1.1	50.8	●	●		Kesennuma
Fudōnosawa Station	1.3	52.1	●	●		Kesennuma
Higashi-Shinjō Station^{＋}	1.4	53.5	●	●		Kesennuma
Kesennuma Station	1.8	55.3	●	●	Ōfunato Line, Ōfunato Line BRT	Kesennuma

=== Ōfunato Line ===
Station name	Distance (km) from		Kesennuma section	Rikuzen-Yahagi section	Connections	Location	
Station name	previous station	Kesennuma	Kesennuma section	Rikuzen-Yahagi section	Connections	Location	
Kesennuma Station	-	0.0	●		Ōfunato Line, Kesennuma Line BRT	Kesennuma, Miyagi Prefecture	
Naiwan-Iriguchi (Yōkamachi) Station^{＋}	1.0	1.0	●			Kesennuma, Miyagi Prefecture	
Shishiorikarakuwa Station	1.2	2.2	●			Kesennuma, Miyagi Prefecture	
Hachiman-Ōhashi (Tōryō High School) Station^{＋}	1.1	3.3	●			Kesennuma, Miyagi Prefecture	
Driving on the Sanriku Coast Expressway						Kesennuma, Miyagi Prefecture	
Karakuwaōsawa Station^{＋}	6.0	13.5	●			Kesennuma, Miyagi Prefecture	
Osabe Station^{＋}	2.3	15.8	●			Iwate Prefecture	Rikuzentakata
Rikuzen-Yahagi Station	1.7	17.5	∥	●		Iwate Prefecture	Rikuzentakata
Rikuzen-Imaizumi Station^{＋}	2.7	20.2	○	∥		Iwate Prefecture	Rikuzentakata
Kiseki-no-Ippon-Matsu Station^{＋}	0.2	20.4	●	∥		Iwate Prefecture	Rikuzentakata
Takekoma Station	0.1	20.5	∥	●		Iwate Prefecture	Rikuzentakata
Tochigasawa-Kōen Park Station^{＋}	1.2	21.7	∥	●		Iwate Prefecture	Rikuzentakata
Rikuzen-Takata Station	1.7	23.4	●	●		Iwate Prefecture	Rikuzentakata
Takatakōkōmae Station^{＋}	0.8	24.2	○	●		Iwate Prefecture	Rikuzentakata
Takata Hospital Station^{＋}	1.4	25.6	○	●		Iwate Prefecture	Rikuzentakata
Wakinosawa Station	0.7	26.3	●	●		Iwate Prefecture	Rikuzentakata
Nishishita Station^{＋}	2.1	28.4	●	●		Iwate Prefecture	Rikuzentakata
Otomo Station	2.4	30.8	●	●		Iwate Prefecture	Rikuzentakata
Goishikaiganguchi Station^{＋}	2.6	33.4	●	●		Iwate Prefecture	Ōfunato
Hosoura Station	1.7	35.1	●	●		Iwate Prefecture	Ōfunato
Ōfunatomarumori Station^{＋}	1.7	36.8	●	●		Iwate Prefecture	Ōfunato
Shimofunato Station	1.4	38.2	●	●		Iwate Prefecture	Ōfunato
Ōfunato Fish Market Station^{＋}	1.5	39.7	●	●		Iwate Prefecture	Ōfunato
Ōfunato Station	1.4	41.1	●	●		Iwate Prefecture	Ōfunato
Jinomori Station^{＋}	0.9	42.0	●	●		Iwate Prefecture	Ōfunato
Tamoyama Station^{＋}	1.0	43.0	●	●		Iwate Prefecture	Ōfunato
Sakari Station	0.7	43.7	●	●	Rias Line	Iwate Prefecture	Ōfunato
