= Miki =

Miki may refer to:

== Places ==
- Miki, Hyōgo, a city in Hyōgo Prefecture, Japan
- Miki, Kagawa, a town in Kagawa Prefecture, Japan
- Miki, Azerbaijan, a village in Astara Rayon, Azerbaijan

== People ==
- Miki (given name)
- Miki (surname)
- Miki Núñez (born 1996), Spanish singer known by the mononym Miki

== Other uses ==
- SF-A2 Miki, a voice bank for the Vocaloid and Synthesizer V lines of singing synthesis software.
- Miki (noodles), or pancit miki, a type of egg noodles from the Philippines
- Miki or omiki is a ritual offering of sake in the Japanese Shinto religion
- Miki (Okinawa), a drink from Okinawa
- Miki (album), an album by Miki Yamanaka.

== See also ==
- Mi-Ki, a crossbreed dog
- Mickey
- Miki's Law, Kansas statutes
- Mikki, a given name
- Miku (disambiguation)
- Myki (disambiguation)
- 幹 (disambiguation)
