= Miki (given name) =

Miki is a given name.

== Japanese name ==
Japanese spellings of the given name Miki include:

- 美紀 "beautiful chronicle"
- 美貴 "beautiful and noble"
- 美樹 "beautiful tree"
- 美希 "beautiful hope"

Miki can also be written みき (in hiragana), and ミキ (in katakana), which both have no meaning.

Japanese people with the name given Miki include:

=== Men ===
- Miki Hayasaka, male Japanese manga artist
- Miki Morita (1896–1985), Japanese character actor who worked in Hollywood
- Miki Shibuya (渋谷 幹; born 1940), male Japanese biathlete
- Miki Tori (とり みき; born 1958), Japanese manga artist, character designer, essayist, and screenplay writer
- Miki Watanabe (渡邉 美樹; born 1959), Japanese businessman and politician
- Miki Yamane (山根 視来; born 1993), male Japanese footballer

=== Women ===
- Miki Aihara (相原 実貴), Japanese shojo mangaka
- Miki Ando (born 1987), Japanese figure skater
- Miki Endo (遠藤 未希; 1986–2011), Japanese employee of the town of Minamisanriku's Crisis Management Department
- Miki Fujimoto (born 1985), a member of Morning Musume
- Miki Fujimura (born 1956), a member of Candies
- Miki Fujitani (born Makiko Kanaya 1973), Japanese actress
- Miki Furukawa (born 1979), Japanese musician, and former bass guitarist and singer for the Japanese rock band Supercar
- Miki Hanada (花田 ミキ; 1914–2006), Japanese researcher of health nursing and health advisor
- Miki Hayakawa (1899–1953), Japanese-American painter and printmaker
- Miki Higashino, Japanese video game music composer
- Miki Igarashi (五十嵐 美紀; born 1971), Japanese long-distance runner
- Miki Imai (disambiguation), multiple people
- Miki Inoue (井上 美紀; born 1967), Japanese voice actress
- Miki Ishii (石井 美樹; born 1989), Japanese beach volleyball player
- Miki Ishikawa (born 1991), member of pop group, T-Squad
- Miki Itakura (板倉 美紀; born 1975), Japanese racewalker
- Miki Ito, multiple people
- Miki Jinbo (神保 美喜; born 1960), Japanese actress and singer
- Miki Kanie (蟹江 美貴; born 1988), Japanese archer
- Miki Kobayashi (小林 美貴; born 1987), Japanese biathlete
- Miki Koyama (小山 美姫; born 1997), Japanese racing driver
- Miki Kozuka (born 1996), Japanese field hockey player
- Miki Matsue Matheson (松江 美季) (born 1973), Japanese runner
- Miki Matsubara (1959–2004), a Japanese singer and songwriter
- Miki Matsuhashi (松橋 未樹; born 1983), Japanese former singer and songwriter
- Miki Maya (真矢 みき; born 1964), Japanese actress and former top star
- Miki Miyamura (宮村 美紀; born 1985), Japanese former tennis player
- Miki Mizokuchi (溝口 美貴; born 1965), Japanese former professional tennis player
- Miki Mizuno (水野 美紀; born 1974), Japanese actress
- Miki Motono (本野 美樹; born 1994), Japanese mixed martial artist
- Miki Nagasawa (born 1970), Japanese voice actress
- Miki Nakamura (中村 美樹; born 1992), Japanese archer
- Miki Nakao (中尾 美樹; born 1978), Japanese former backstroke swimmer
- Miki Nakatani (born 1976), Japanese actress and singer
- Miki Nakayama (1798–1887), founder of Tenrikyo
- Miki Narahashi (born 1960), Japanese voice actress
- Miki Nishimura (西村 美紀; born 1985), Japanese female professional ten-pin bowler
- Miki Nishino (西野 未姫; born 1999), Japanese television personality and former idol
- Miki Ogasawara (小笠原 幹; born 1974), Japanese speed skater
- Miki Onaga (翁長 実希; born 1997), Japanese racing driver
- Miki Oyama (大山 未希; born 1985), Japanese former volleyball player
- Miki Saito (斉藤 美紀; born 1968), Japanese swimmer
- Miki Sakai (酒井 美紀; born 1978), Japanese actress and J-pop idol singer
- Miki Sasaki (born 1976), Japanese volleyball player
- Miki Satō, multiple people
- Miki Sawada (澤田 美喜; 1901–1980), Japanese social worker
- Miki Shimomura (下村 実生; 1901–1980), Japanese fashion model and former idol singer
- Miki Sugawara (菅原 美希), Japanese former football player
- Miki Sugimoto (杉本 美樹; born 1953), Japanese actress
- Miki Sumiyoshi (住吉 美紀; born 1973), Japanese announcer
- Miki Takahashi (高橋 美紀; born 1961), Japanese voice actress and singer
- Miki Takai (高井 美紀; 1967–2023), Japanese announcer
- Miki Takakura (高倉 美貴; born 1960), Japanese gravure idol and pink film actress
- Miki Tanaka (田中 美衣; born 1987), Japanese judoka
- Miki Uchida (内田 美希; born 1995), Japanese swimmer
- Miki Uemura (上村 美揮; born 1986), Japanese female artistic gymnast
- Miki Yamada (山田 美樹; born 1974), Japanese politician
- Miki Yamanaka (山中 迪貴; born 1990), Japanese jazz musician
- Miki Yanagi (柳 美稀; born 1997), Japanese actress and fashion model
- Miki Yoda (要田 美紀; born 1963), Japanese Paralympic athlete
- Miki Yokobori (born 1975), Japanese former professional tennis player
- Miki Yoshikawa (吉河 美希; born 1982), Japanese manga artist

== Other ==
- Miki Agrawal, Canadian businesswoman
- Miki Antony (born 1947), British singer
- Miki Berenyi (born 1967), former lead singer of Lush
- Miki Berkovich (born 1954), Israeli former basketball player
- Miki Biasion (born 1958), Italian rally driver
- Miki Bosch (born 2001), Spanish professional footballer
- Miki Bunge (born 1963), German publisher and the founder of Goliath Books
- Miki Del Prete (born 1935), Italian lyricist and record producer
- Miki Dora, American surfer
- Miki Esparbé (born 1983), Spanish actor
- Miki Garro (born 1975), Spanish former footballer
- Miki Gavrielov (born 1949), Israeli composer and performer of folk/rock music
- Miki Geva (born 1979), Israeli stand-up comedian, musician and actor
- Miki González (born 1952), Spanish-Peruvian musician, composer and producer
- Miki Gorman (1935–2015), American marathon runner
- Miki Haimovich (born 1962), Israeli television presenter, former politician and veganism activist
- Miki Halika, Israeli swimmer
- Miki Hood (1915–1994), English stage and film actress
- Miki Howard (born Alicia Michelle Howard), African-American singer and actress
- Miki Janković (born 1994), Serbian tennis coach and former professional tennis player
- Miki Jevremović (1941–2017), Serbian and Yugoslav singer of popular music
- Miki Kaeok (born 1974), Papua New Guinean politician
- Miki Kam (born 1955), Israeli actress, comedian, dubber and singer
- Miki Kratsman (born 1959), Israeli photographer, photojournalist and activist
- Miki Liukkonen (1989–2023), Finnish writer, poet and musician
- Miki Lladó (born 1989), Spanish football manager
- Miki Magasiva, Samoan-born filmmaker
- Miki Malör (born 1957), Austrian theatre creator, director and performance artist
- Miki Manojlović (born 1950), Serbian actor
- Miki McFadden (born 1948), American volleyball player
- Miki Meek, American radio producer and journalist
- Miki Monrás (born 1992), Spanish professional racing driver
- Miki Muster (1925–2018), Slovenian academic sculptor, illustrator, cartoonist, and animator
- Miki Muñoz (born 1995), Spanish professional footballer
- Miki Nadal (born 1967), Spanish comedian and actor
- Miki Núñez, Spanish singer, representing Spain in the Eurovision Song Contest 2019 with the song "La venda", known by the mononym Miki
- Miki Oca (born 1970), Spanish former water polo player
- Miki Orachev (born 1996), Bulgarian footballer
- Miki Polonski (born 1982), Israeli film director and screenwriter
- Miki Ratsula, Finnish-American nonbinary artist
- Miki Roqué (1988–2012), Spanish professional footballer
- Miki Sipiläinen (born 1986), Finnish footballer
- Miki Siroshtein (born 1989), Israeli footballer
- Miki Sudo (born 1985), American competitive eater
- Miki Turner (born 1958), African-American professor, photojournalist and sports columnist
- Miki Villar (born 1996), Spanish professional footballer
- Miki Wali, Fijian activist
- Miki Yazo (born 1991), Israeli footballer
- Miki Yeung (born 1985), Cantonese pop singer from Hong Kong
- Miki Zohar (born 1980), Israeli politician
- Miki Đuričić (born 1977), Serbian television personality

== Fictional characters ==
- Miki Aono, a character from Fresh Pretty Cure!
- Miki Naoki, a character from Gakkou Gurashi!
- Miki (Chrono Cross), a dancer from the Square RPG Chrono Cross
- Miki Hoshii, a character from The Idolmaster series
- Miki Ikeda, a character in the film Battle Royale II: Requiem
- Miki Momozono or Goggle Pink, a character from Dai Sentai Goggle V
- Miki Kaoru, a character in the anime, "Revolutionary Girl Utena"
- Miki Koishikawa, the main character in the anime Marmalade Boy
- Miki Kiyora, a character in the manga, Nodame Cantabile
- Miki Konoha, a character from the anime adaptation of the manga, Pokonyan!
- Miki Masaki, a character from Juken Sentai Gekiranger
- Miki Saegusa, a character in Godzilla vs. Biollante, Godzilla vs. King Ghidorah, Godzilla vs. Mothra, Godzilla vs. Mechagodzilla II, Godzilla vs. SpaceGodzilla, and Godzilla vs. Destoroyah
- Miki (Shugo Chara!), a fictional character in the manga series Shugo Chara! by Peach-Pit
- Miki Yoshida, the main character in the Original English-language manga Miki Falls
- Miki Mei Ling, a character in the film Dangerous Flowers portrayed by Narawan Techaratanapraser
- Miki Hatori - a character from the manga Life
- Miki Hiiragi - minor character from the anime and manga series Lucky Star who is the mother of the Hiiragi family
- Miki Makimura, a character from the Devilman franchise
- Miki Sayaka, one of the main characters of Puella Magi Madoka Magica
- Miki, a "Sly Girl" in the book Extras, from the series Uglies, by Scott Westerfeld
- Miki Tamase, a character from the visual novel Muv-Luv series
- Miki Nomura, a character from the visual novel Summer Pockets
