= Myki (disambiguation) =

Myki is the ticketing system for public transport in Victoria, Australia.

Myki may also refer to:

== Places ==
- Myki, Greece, a municipality in Xanthi regional unit, Western Thrace, Greece
- Myki, Poland, a village in Warmian-Masurian Voivodeship, Poland

== Other uses ==
- Myki (password manager), a password manager developed by Myki Inc.

== See also ==
- Miki (disambiguation)
- Mikki, a given name
- Mykki, 2016 studio album by Mykki Blanco
- Mykie, American YouTuber and make-up artist
