= 幹 =

幹 or 干 may refer to:

- Gan, a Chinese given name, see Gan (disambiguation)#People
- Kan, a Japanese masculine given name, see Kan (disambiguation)#People
- Miki (given name), a Japanese unisex given name

== See also ==
- Miki (disambiguation)
