= Iwatsuki Station =

Iwatsuki Station may refer to:

- Iwatsuki Station (Miyagi)
- Iwatsuki Station (Saitama)
