= Micu =

Micu is a Romanian surname literally meaning "a small one". Notable people with the surname include:

- Alexandra Micu, Romanian fashion model
- Ana Maria Micu (born 1979) is a Romanian visual artist
- Dumitru Micu (1928–2018), Romanian historian and literary critic
- Inocențiu Micu-Klein (1692–1768), Romanian bishop
- Ioan Micu Moldovan (1833–1915), Romanian historian, theologian, folklorist, philologist and pedagogue
- Mircea Micu (1937–2010), Romanian author
- Radu Andrei Micu (born 1982), Romanian actor
- Samuil Micu-Klein (September 1745 – 13 May 1806) was a Romanian Greek-Catholic theologian, historian, philologist and philosopher

== See also ==
- Miku (disambiguation)
