= Miku =

Miku may refer to:

== People ==
=== Given name ===
- Miku (みく), the vocalist for the Japanese rock band An Cafe
- Miku Aono (青野 未来; born 1990), Japanese professional wrestler, actress and gravure idol
- Miku Ichinose (一ノ瀬 美空), member of the Japanese idol girl group Nogizaka46
- Miku Ishida (未来), Japanese teen idol
- Miku Itō (美来), Japanese voice actress
- Miku Kanemura (美玖), Japanese singer and model
- Miku Kobato (小鳩 ミク), member of the Japanese rock band Band-Maid
- Miku Koide (未来), Japanese water polo player
- Miku Kojima (小嶋 美玖; born 1999), Japanese footballer
- Miku Martineau (born 2004) Canadian actress, voiceover artist, and singer
- Miku Makita, Canadian ice dancer
- Miku Matsumoto (松本 未来; born 1981), Japanese mixed martial artist
- Miku Nihira (仁平 美来; born 2002), Japanese curler
- Miku Nishimoto-Neubert, a classical pianist
- Miku Nishizaki (西﨑 美空), member of the Japanese idol girl group Ocha Norma
- Miku Sawai (沢井 美空; born 1993), Japanese musician
- Miku Okada (岡田 美紅; born 1997), member of the Japanese idol girl group SKE48
- Miku Tanaka (born 2001), Japanese idol group of HKT48
- Miku Tanabe (生来), Japanese idol
- Miku Tashiro (未来), Japanese judoka

=== Nickname ===
- Miku (footballer), a nickname of Venezuelan footballer Nicolás Ladislao Fedor Flores (born 1985)

== Fictional characters ==
- Miku Hinasaki (深紅), a character from the video game series Fatal Frame
- Miku Nekobe (美紅), a character from the manga Midori Days
- Miku Izayoi (誘宵 美九), a character in Date A Live
- Miku Imamura (今村 みく), a character in the tokusatsu Denji Sentai Megaranger
- Miku Kohinata, a character in the anime Senki Zesshou Symphogear
- Miku (390), a character in the anime Darling in the Franxx
- Miku Nakano (中野 三玖), a character in the anime/manga The Quintessential Quintuplets
- Miku Nishio (西尾 三玖), a character in the anime Ongaku Shoujo
- Miku Sakura (桜 みく), a main protagonist of I Want to End This Love Game
- Miku Suride (須理出 未来), a character in the anime Do It Yourself!!
- Hatsune Miku (初音 ミク), a female singer first introduced in 2007 by Crypton Future Media

== Places ==
- Miku, Estonia, a village in Meremäe Parish, Võru County, Estonia
- Miku, a mukim in Rembau District, Negeri Sembilan, Malaysia

== Music ==
- "Miku" (song), a song by the American band Anamanaguchi featuring Hatsune Miku, as listed above

== See also ==
- Metal Fighter Miku, a Japanese animated television series
- Hatsune Miku (disambiguation)
- Micu
