= Naiwan-Iriguchi (Yōkamachi) Station =

Bus rapid transit line station

Naiwan-Iriguchi (Yōkamachi) Station 内湾入口（八日町）駅
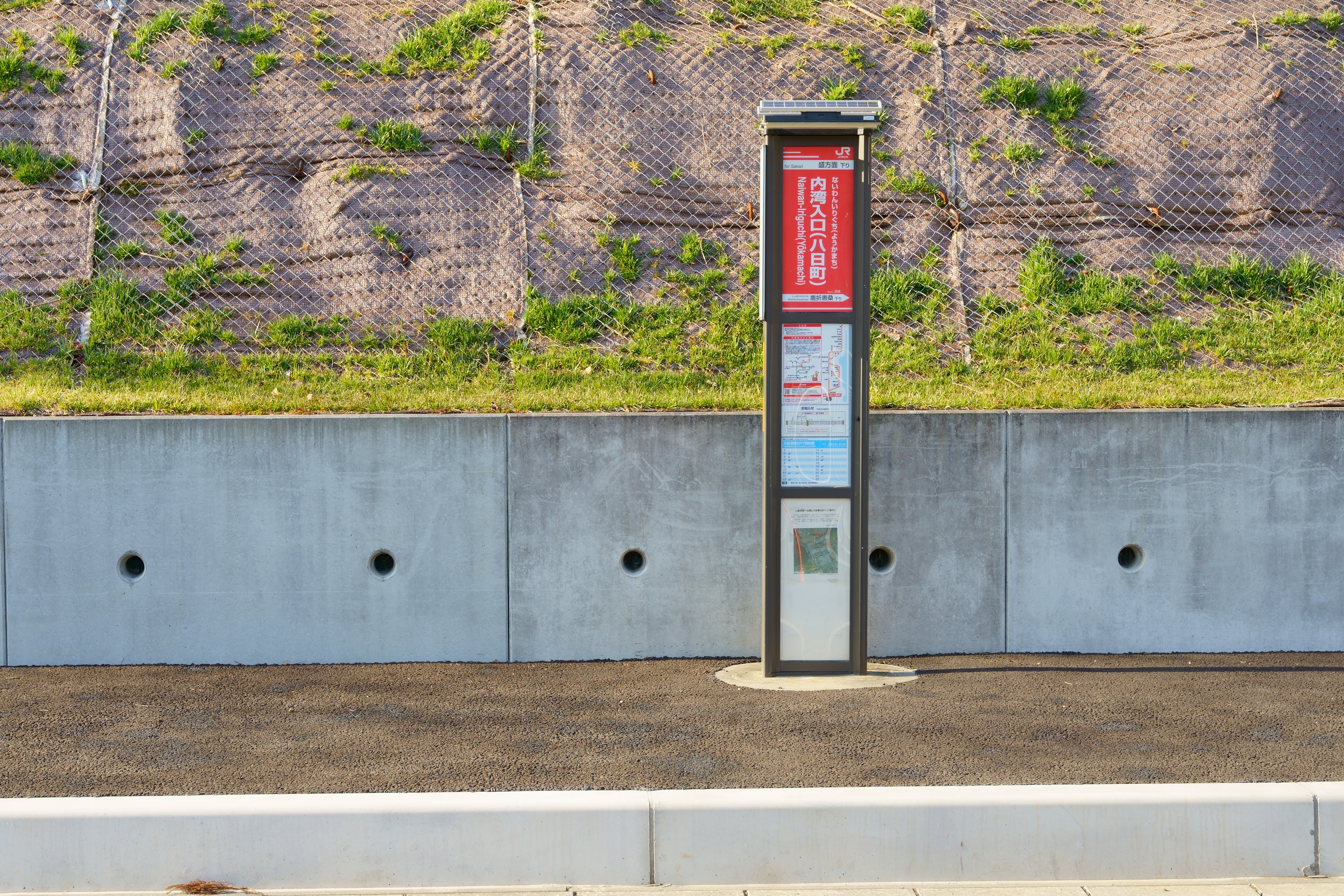

General information
- Location: Yokamachi, Kesennuma, Miyagi （宮城県気仙沼市八日町） Japan
- Coordinates: 38°54′31″N 141°34′13″E
- Operator: JR East
- Line: ■ Ōfunato Line BRT
- Platforms: double sides platform

History
- Opened: 12 March 2022

Services
Preceding station	JR East	Following station
Kesennuma towards Maeyachi	Kesennuma / Ōfunato BRT	Shishiorikarakuwa towards Sakari
Location
- Location within Japan

Naiwan-Iriguchi (Yōkamachi) Station (内湾入口（八日町）駅, Naiwan-Iriguchi (Yōkamachi eki)) is a JR East bus rapid transit line station.

== Lines ==
Naiwan-Iriguchi Station is served by the Ōfunato Line BRT, and is located 63 kilometers from the terminus of the line at Ichinoseki Station.

== History ==
The section between Kesennuma Station and Sakari Station of the Ofunato Line collapsed during the 2011 Tōhoku earthquake and tsunami, after which it was reconstructed as a bus rapid transit in December 2015. Kesennuma, Miyagi applied for the installation of nine new stations including Naiwan-Iriguchi along the Kesennuma BRT line in July 2016.

At first, the new station's name was to be "Kesennuma Shiyakusho-mae" (Kesennuma City Hall), however the city hall was later moved elsewhere. The approval for the new station in June 2020 attracted the public to propose names. These included "Kesennumawan Gateway", "Kanaegaura", and "Kesennuma Naiwan", with all proposed names emphasizing Kesennuma Bay in one way or another.

On 3 June 2020 construction of the stations were approved during the "First Kesennuma Public Transportation Conference" (令和2年度第1回気仙沼市地域公共交通会議). On 25 June 2021 construction was officially announced by JR East. On 12 March 2022 the station opened.

== Surrounding area ==
The station is located behind Kesennuma City Hall. However, it was announced that the city hall was to be moved elsewhere in January 2020.
