= Hatsune Miku (disambiguation) =

Hatsune Miku is a Vocaloid software voicebank and its official anthropomorphic mascot character made by Crypton Future Media. The name may also refer to:

== Video games ==
- Hatsune Miku: Colorful Stage!, a Japanese mobile rhythm game created by Colorful Palette
- Hatsune Miku: Project DIVA, a series of rhythm games created by Sega
- Hatsune Miku: Project DIVA Arcade, a 2010 arcade rhythm game created by Sega
- Hatsune Miku: Project DIVA F, a 2012 rhythm game created by Sega
- Hatsune Miku: Project DIVA F 2nd, a 2014 rhythm game created by Sega
- Hatsune Miku: Project DIVA X, a 2016 rhythm game created by Sega
- Hatsune Miku: Project DIVA (video game), a 2009 rhythm game created by Sega
- Hatsune Miku: Project Mirai 2, a 2015 rhythm game created by Sega
- Hatsune Miku: Project DIVA 2nd, a 2010 rhythm game created by Sega
- Hatsune Miku and Future Stars: Project Mirai, a 2012 rhythm game created by Sega

== Manga ==
- Hatsune Miku: Unofficial Hatsune Mix, a Japanese manga

== Software ==
- MikuMikuDance, a freeware animation program
- Domino's app feat. Hatsune Miku, a discontinued Japan-exclusive delivery app
