= Domino's App feat. Hatsune Miku =

Food delivery app launched in 2013

- Official cover art for the service, showing Hatsune Miku holding an iPhone 5
- Developer: Kayac
- Type: Food delivery
- Launched: March 7, 2013
- Operating system: iOS
- Status: Discontinued
- Website: miku.dominos.jp (archived)

Domino's App feat. Hatsune Miku (Note: (Japanese: 「Domino's App feat. 初音ミク」)) is a discontinued food delivery app released exclusively in Japan that was developed by Kayac and hosted by Domino's Pizza. Launched in March 2013, the app was a collaboration between Domino's Pizza Japan and Crypton Future Media, the creators and developers of the Vocaloid software voicebank Hatsune Miku. The app's functions were similar to the traditional Domino's App but had additional features themed around Hatsune Miku. The service became an Internet meme after a commercial for the service went viral on YouTube.

== Features ==
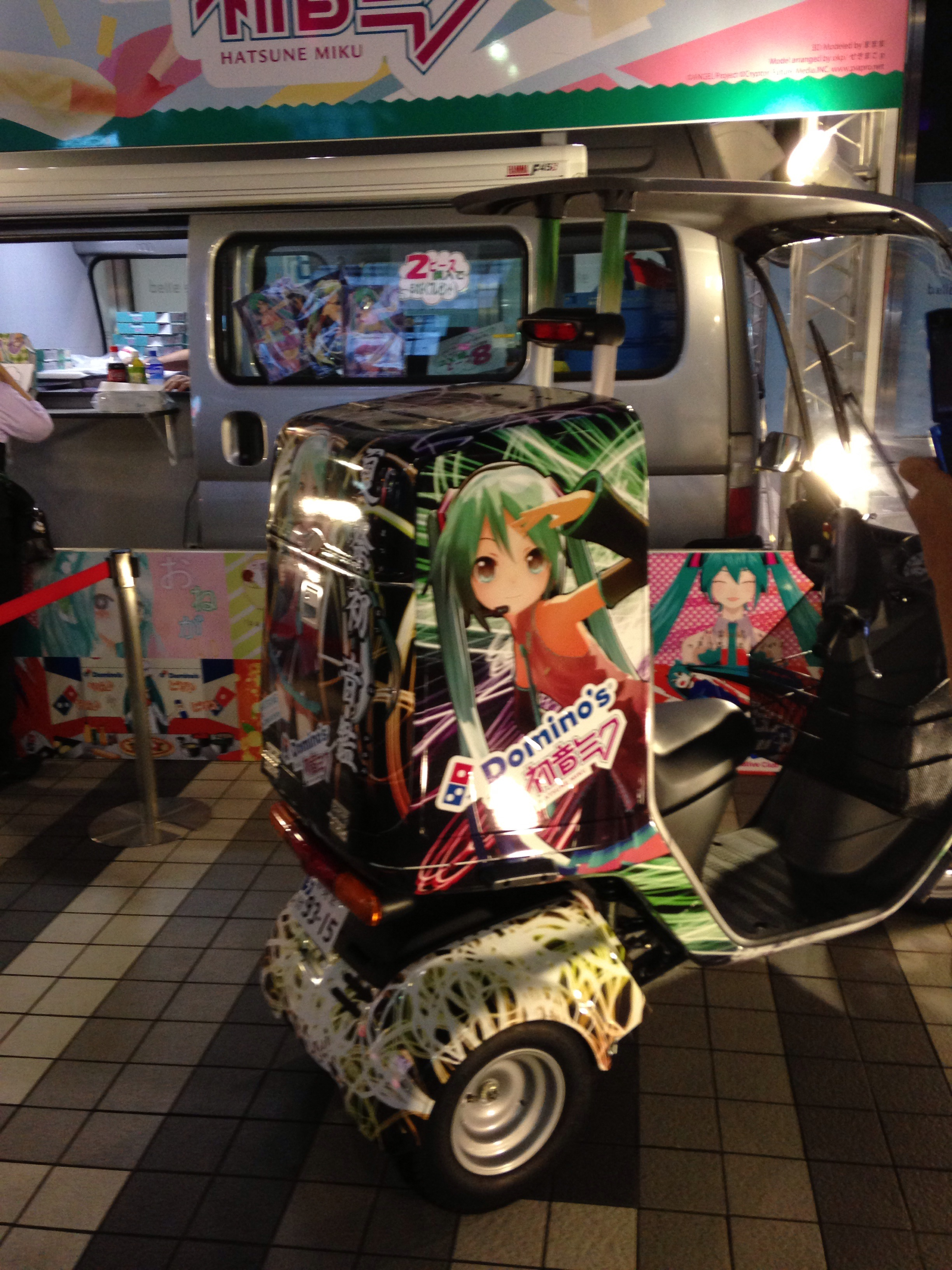
A Hatsune Miku-branded delivery scooter used during the collaboration

Domino's App feat. Hatsune Miku was similar to the previously released Domino's App, but with Hatsune Miku branding and themes. Through the app, users could order pizzas, listen to songs composed by Domino's Pizza Japan employees using Vocaloid, and take pictures with Miku using augmented reality. During certain timeframes, pizzas ordered through the app would be delivered in Miku-themed pizza boxes, which could be scanned in the app to summon an augmented reality Miku. The app's tracking features were also themed around Miku; the GPS was changed to feature Miku and Vocaloid music was used to alert customers of their order's status. Some pizzas ordered through the app were delivered on Miku-branded scooters.

== Development and release ==
Domino's App feat. Hatsune Miku was developed and planned by the joint-stock corporation Kayac, and was published by the Japanese subsidiary of the pizza chain Domino's Pizza, Domino's Pizza Japan. In fall 2012, some employees of Domino's Pizza Japan were tasked with composing songs using the Hatsune Miku software bank, a selection of which were later used in the app.

The app was released on March 7, 2013, one day after the commercial for the service had been released. An update to the app was released in July. The app was removed from the App Store following the iOS 11 update, which discontinued support for 32-bit applications.

Sales during the lifetime of Domino's App feat. Hatsune Miku exceeded expectations; according to Domino's Pizza Japan, sales were twice what they had forecast. Six days after the service's launch, all Hatsune Miku-themed boxes were sold out throughout Japan; they were restocked later that month.

=== Marketing ===
On March 6, 2013, the day before its release, a commercial for the app was uploaded to YouTube by Domino's Pizza Japan. This features the then-president and CEO of Domino's Pizza Japan, Scott Oelkers, discussing and describing the app. The commercial features Japanese subtitles but Oelkers speaks in English, unlike his previous appearances in Domino's Pizza commercials in which he had spoken in the language of the target audiences. The commercial went viral and had over 230 thousand views shortly after its release. By the time it was removed from the Domino's Pizza Japan YouTube channel in around March 2018, it had been viewed over 1 million times.

Brian Ashcraft of Kotaku wrote that Oelkers would "totally weird you out" and that the commercial was "rather strange." VentureBeat's Sean Ludwig called the commercial "amazingly bad", noting how Oelkers's attempt to generate excitement about the app "fell flat", but he also thought that if a viewer did not understand English then the commercial may not be "as terrible". The app won an award at the 12th Mobile Advertising Awards in 2013 for its marketing.
