= Miki Imai =

Miki Imai is the name of:

- Miki Imai (singer) (今井 美樹, born 1963), Japanese pop singer and actress
- Miki Imai (athlete) (born 1975), Japanese high jumper
