= Rikuzen-Togura Station =

Former railway station in Minamisanriku, Miyagi Prefecture, Japan

Coordinates: 38°38′53″N 141°26′00″E

Rikuzen-Togura 陸前戸倉
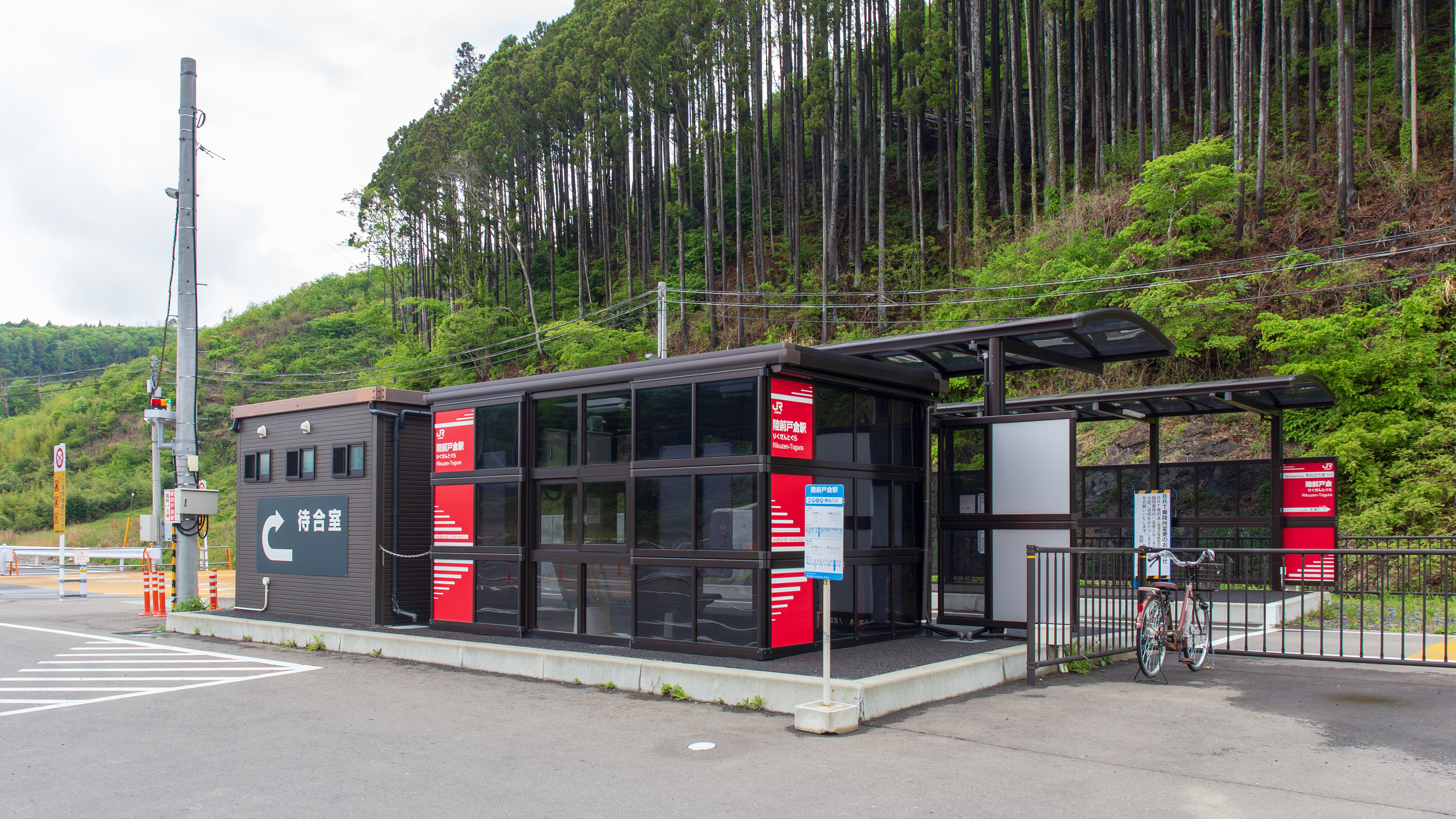
- Rikuzen-Togura Station in 2018

General information
- Location: Togura, Minamisanriku, Motoyoshi, Miyagi （宮城県南三陸町戸倉） Japan
- Operator: JR East
- Line: ■ Kesennuma Line

History
- Opened: 1977

Services
Preceding station	JR East	Following station
Rikuzen-Yokoyama towards Maeyachi	Kesennuma / Ōfunato BRT	Shizugawa towards Sakari
Location

Rikuzen-Togura Station (陸前戸倉駅, Rikuzen-Togura-eki) was a JR East railway station located in Minamisanriku, Miyagi Prefecture, Japan. The station was destroyed by the 2011 tsunami and surrounding railway track was washed away. Services have now been replaced by a provisional bus rapid transit line.

== Lines ==
Rikuzen-Togura Station was served by the Kesennuma Line, and was located 29.5 rail kilometers from the terminus of the line at Maeyachi Station.

== Station layout ==
Rikuzen-Togura Station had a single side platform serving traffic in both directions. The station was unattended.

== History ==
Rikuzen-Togura Station opened on 11 December 1977. The station was absorbed into the JR East network upon the privatization of the Japan National Railways (JNR) on April 1, 1987. Operations were discontinued after the station was severely damaged by the 2011 Tōhoku earthquake and tsunami, and rail services have now been replaced by a bus rapid transit line.

== Surrounding area ==
- Japan National Route 45
- Japan National Route 398
- Shizuhama Port
- Togura Post Office
- Togura Elementary School
- Togura Middle School
