= Mikki =

Mikki is a given name. Notable people with the name include:

- Mikki Osei Berko (born 1973), Ghanaian-born actor
- Mikki Daughtry, American screenwriter and young adult fiction author
- Mikki Hebl, American psychologist
- Mikki Kendall (born 1976), American author, activist, and cultural critic
- Mikki Kunttu, Finnish lighting and set designer
- Mikki Moore (born 1975), American professional basketball player
- Mikki Norris (born 1952), American drug policy activist, politician and author
- Mikki Padilla (born 1974), American actress, model and writer
- Mikki Piras, American slalom canoer who competed in the mid-1970s
- Mikki van Sas (born 2004), Dutch professional footballer

Fictional characters:

- Mikki (Kiba), a character on Kiba
- Mikki Diamond, a character on Ace of Wands
- Mikki Hiiri, the finnish name for Mickey Mouse

== See also ==
- Miki (disambiguation)
- Mickey (disambiguation)
