= Miki Endo =

Japanese public servant (1986–2011)

- Born: July 18, 1986; Japan
- Died: March 11, 2011 (aged 24); Minamisanriku, Japan
- Occupation: Public servant
- Known for: Self-sacrifice in order to warn others of the incoming 2011 Tōhoku earthquake and tsunami

Japanese name
- Kanji: 遠藤 未希
- Romanization: Endō Miki

Miki Endo (July 18, 1986 – March 11, 2011) was a Japanese public servant who served at the town of Minamisanriku for Crisis Management Department, tasked with broadcasting disaster advisories and warnings.

During the 2011 Tōhoku earthquake and tsunami, she remained at her post on the second floor of the three-storey Crisis Management Center continuing to broadcast warnings and alerts over the community loudspeaker system as the tsunami swept over the building, silencing the loudspeakers, killing her, and overwhelming the town. Of the approximately 40 people who fled to the roof of the building, only 11 survived, by clinging to the rooftop antenna.

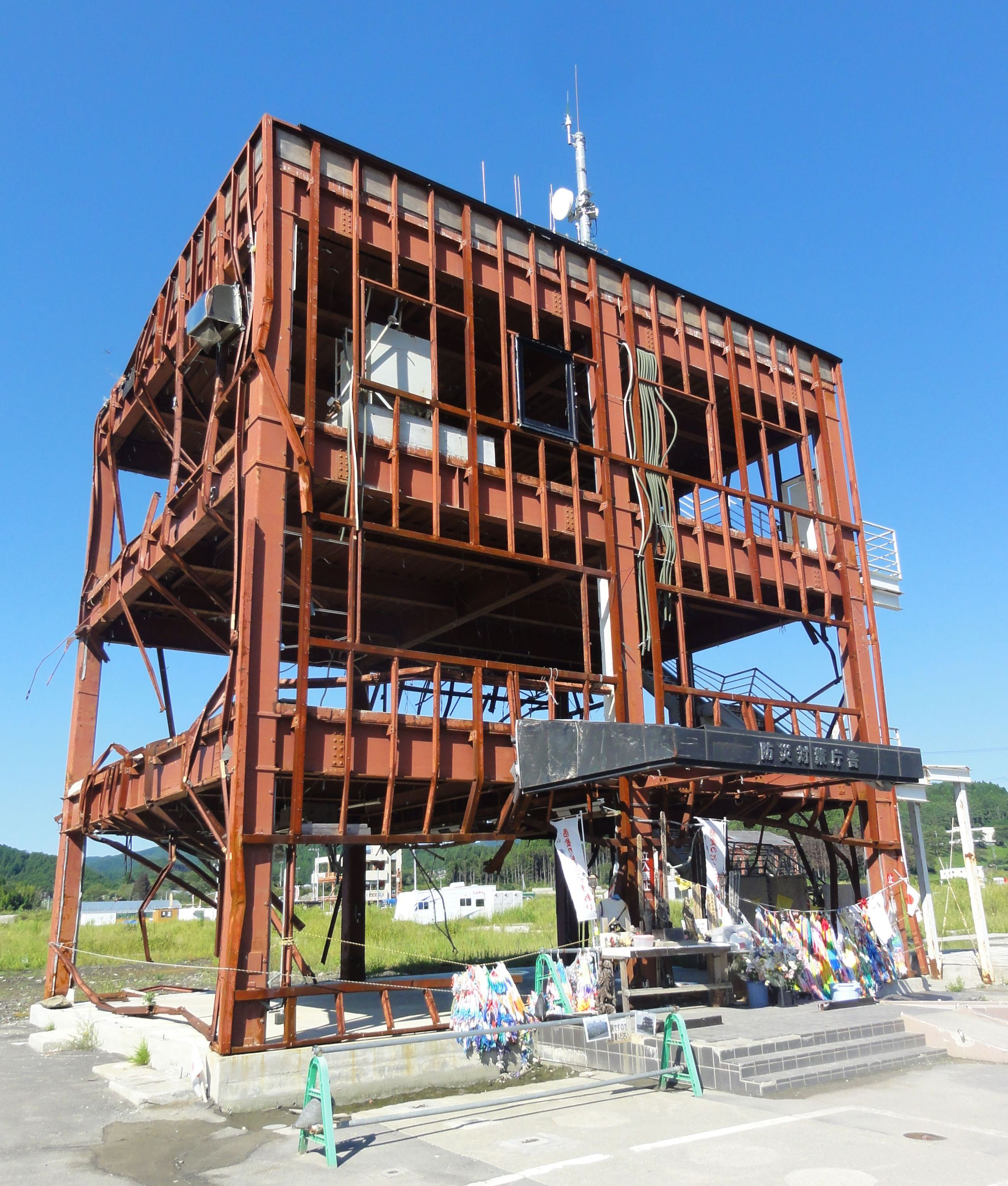
The remnants of the Crisis Management Department Building where Miki Endo was swept away by the tsunami

She was hailed in the Japanese news media as a heroine for sacrificing her life and was credited with saving many lives. Miki's body was discovered and identified by authorities on 23 April 2011.

The three-storey headquarters of the department remained standing but was completely gutted, with only a red-coloured steel skeleton remaining. Photos show the roof of the building completely submerged at the height of the inundation, with some people clinging to the rooftop antenna. The remnants of the building have been preserved during the city's recovery.
