= Miki Ratsula =

American artist

- Born: June 30, 1998 (age 28); Southern California, United States
- Origin: Southern California, U.S.
- Genres: Indie pop Bedroom pop Acoustic; Lo-fi
- Occupations: Singer; songwriter; record producer; producer
- Years active: 2016–present
- Label: Nettwerk Music Group
- Website: mikiratsula.com

Miki Ratsula (born June 30, 1998) is a Finnish-American non-binary singer, songwriter, and record producer based in Southern California.

== Biography ==
Based in Southern California, Ratsula holds a BA in psychology.

Their EP, Made For Them, showcases Ratsula's reinterpretation of tracks by artists such as Harry Styles, Phoebe Bridgers, and Dodie, utilizing gender-neutral pronouns and references.

Ratsula's debut LP, I Owe It To Myself, encompasses a lo-fi indie-pop genre. Tracks such as "Sugarcane" and "Suffocate" have gained positive reception. The single "Suffocate" notably includes a collaboration with Los Angeles-based singer Lauren Sanderson.

== Discography ==
=== Studio albums ===
- i owe it to myself (2022)
- i'll be fine if i want to (2023)

=== Extended plays ===
- Every Shade of Blue (2016)
- EVERYTHING&NOTHING (2020)
- made for them (2022)
- Winter's Over (2026)

=== Selected singles ===
- "Somewhere Only We Know" (2017)
- "Wicked" (2019)
- "Missing June" (2020)
- "suffocate" (featuring Lauren Sanderson) (2021)
- "sugarcane" (featuring Dana Williams) (2022)
- "jealous of my brother" (2023)
- "blue balloons" (featuring Semler) (2023)
- "what would the neighbors think?" (2023)
- "if i blame myself" (2023)
- "lied to your therapist" (featuring OSTON) (2023)
- "elephant" (2024)
- "kissed a girl" (2024)
- "coming up empty" (2025)
- "Supposed to Be" (2025)
- "God & Politicians" (2026)
