= Shizuhama Station =

Former railway station in Minamisanriku, Miyagi Prefecture, Japan

Coordinates: 38°41′25″N 141°29′13″E

Shizuhama 清水浜
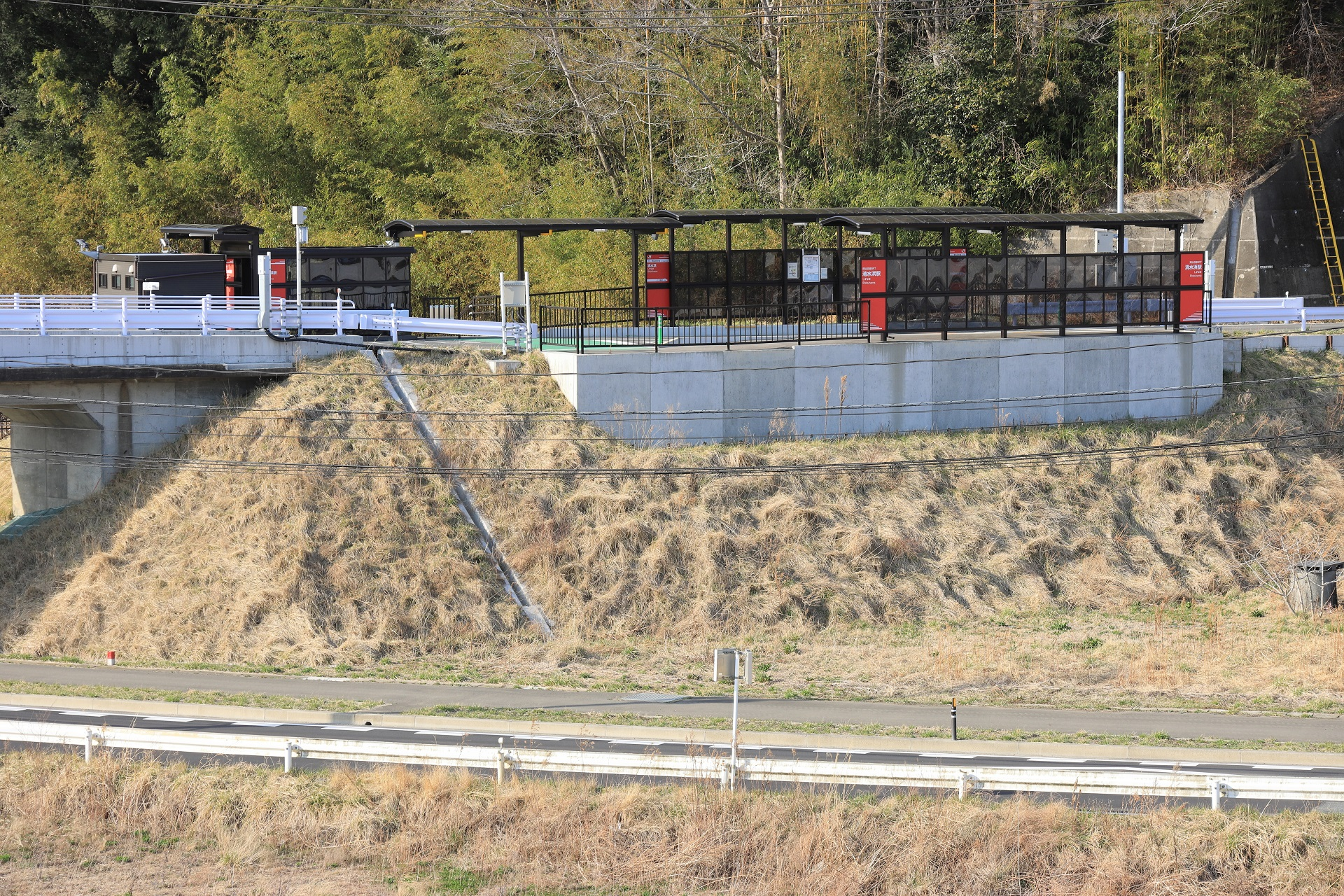
- Shizuhama Station in March 2021

General information
- Location: Shizugawa-ave Oda 2-8, Minamisanriku, Motoyoshi, Miyagi （宮城県南三陸町志津川字小田2-8） Japan
- Operator: JR East
- Line: Kesennuma Line

History
- Opened: 1977

Services
Preceding station	JR East	Following station
Shizugawa-Chūōdanchi towards Maeyachi	Kesennuma / Ōfunato BRT	Utatsu towards Sakari

Former services
Preceding station	JR East	Following station
Shizugawa towards Kogota	Kesennuma Line	Utatsu towards Kesennuma
Location

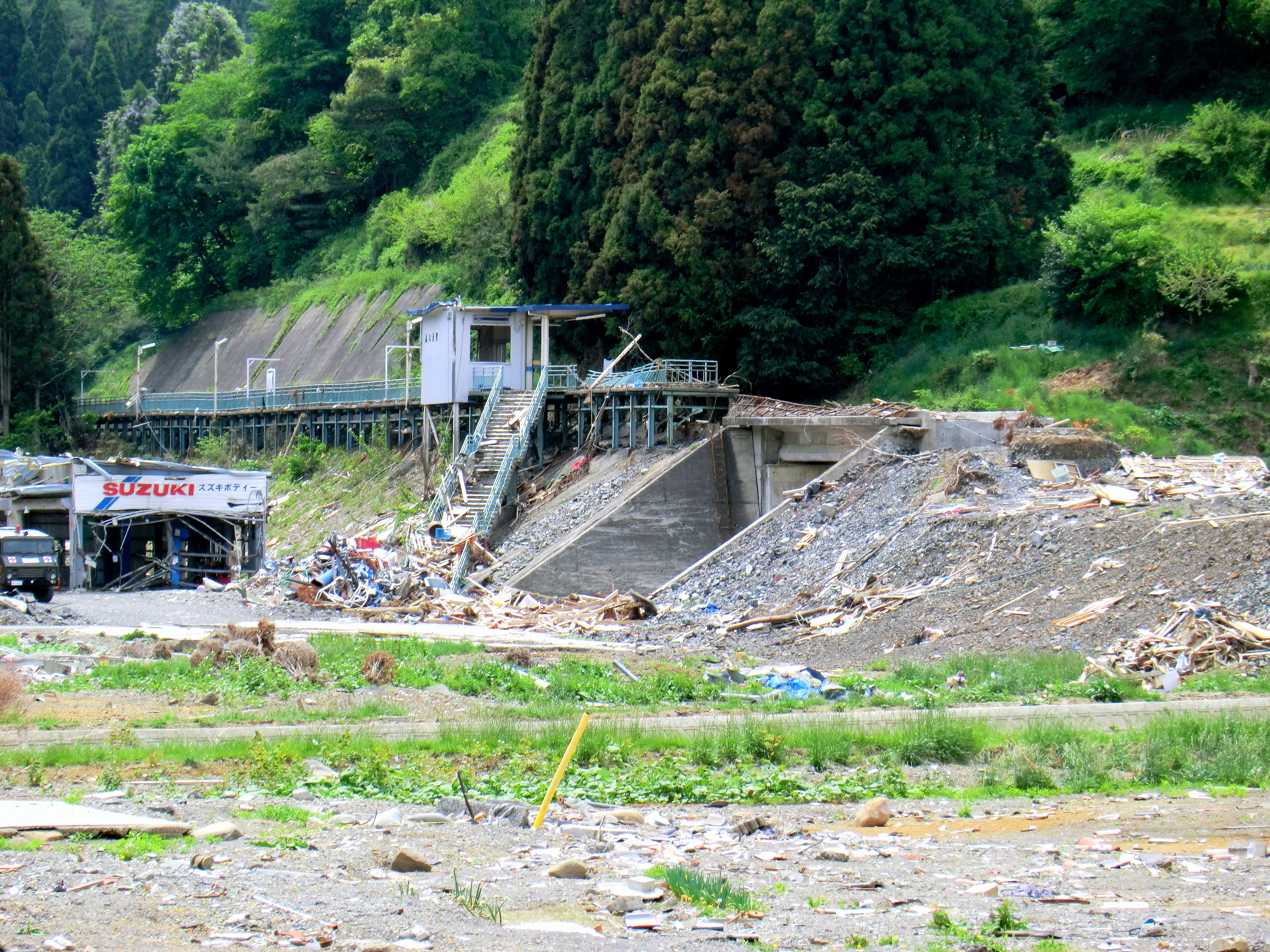
Shizuhama Station after the 2011 earthquake

Shizuhama Station (清水浜駅, Shizuhama-eki) was a JR East railway station located in Minamisanriku, Miyagi Prefecture, Japan. The blue-roofed station platform remained standing after the 2011 tsunami, however the adjacent railway bridge and track (southwest of the station) collapsed. Services have now been replaced by a provisional bus rapid transit line.

== Lines ==
Shizuhama Station was served by the Kesennuma Line, and was located 38.2 rail kilometers from the terminus of the line at Maeyachi Station.

== Station layout ==
Shizuhama Station had a single side platform serving traffic in both directions. The station was unattended.

== History ==
Shizuhama Station opened on 11 December 1977. The station was absorbed into the JR East network upon the privatization of the Japan National Railways (JNR) on April 1, 1987. Operations were discontinued after the station was severely damaged by the 2011 Tōhoku earthquake and tsunami, and rail services have now been replaced by a bus rapid transit line.

== Surrounding area ==
- Japan National Route 45
- Shizu Elementary School
