= Miki Hanada =

Japanese researcher and health reformist (1914-2006)

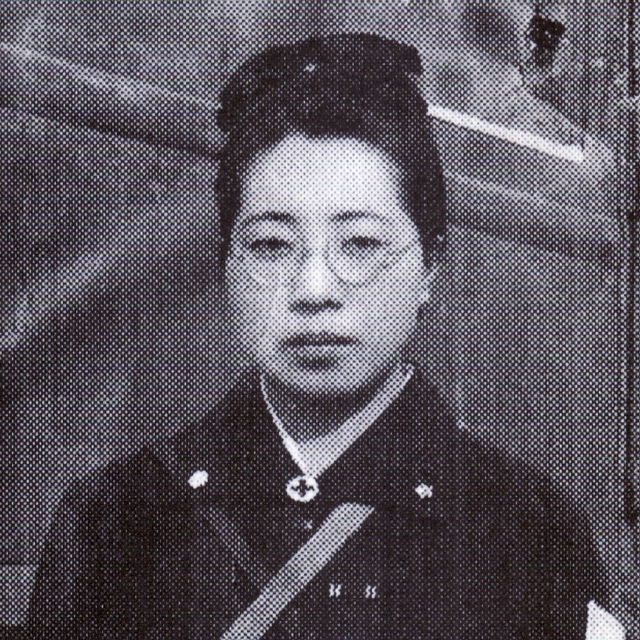
- Born: 9 September 1914; Hirosaki, Aomori Prefecture, Japan
- Died: 1 August 2006 (age 91)
- Occupation: Nurse
- Notable work: Reforms of nursing in Aomori Prefecture after the Second World War; Foundation of Aomori Prefectural Nursing School (later Aomori University of Health and Welfare); Resolution of infant mortality in Aomori Prefecture; Establishment of visiting public health nursing system; Provision for the aging society in Aomori
- Awards: Public Health Award; To-o Award

Miki Hanada (花田 ミキ, Hanada Miki; 9 September 1914 – 1 August 2006) was a Japanese researcher of health nursing and health advisor.

She devoted herself to saving lives and health of people in Aomori Prefecture after the World War II, making efforts in building the educational institute for nurses, resolving towns and villages without health nurses from the standpoint of health administration, and establishing the system of rescue and nursing in remote areas. Her attitude has been handed down to a number of people who engage in nursing in Aomori even in Heisei period. Having worked as a military nurse during the war, she is known as a person who kept on telling her experiences during the war through self-published books because of an unwavering belief that "everything that stands against life is evil".

== Biography ==
=== Before and during WWII ===
After graduating from Aomori Hirosaki Girls' High School (later Aomori Prefectural Hirosaki Chuo High School), she had to give up the further study because of the financial difficulty of her family and decided to be independent as a nurse. After gaining her career in Japanese Red Cross Society (JRCS) and Morioka Nursing School, she started to work for Aomori Branch of JRCS in 1934. She was called up as a military nurse after the Second Sino-Japanese War broke out in 1937, thus she spent almost all her youth in the battlefields.

In 1942, she suffered from tuberculosis and typhoid fever on the hospital ships then went into the Hiroshima Military Hospital (later Hiroshima Red Cross Hospital & Atomic-bomb Survivors Hospital). Although she had not chosen to be a nurse due to humanitarianism, she was impressed with devoted nursing by a nurse while hospitalized there, which greatly changed her thought of health nursing.

She returned to the military after recovering from the typhoid fever. Gradually she agonized herself with the death of many soldiers and the reality that soldiers who recovered from wounds in the hospital go to their death again, she harbored her resentment against war itself finally concluding that "everything that stands against life is evil". At least by way of resisting the war, she continued to send the wills of soldiers dying in bed to their families without being noticed by the inspectors.

The following year, 1943, she returned home because her tuberculosis was not cured. After studying hard, she got the certifications of a teacher of nursing and of a health nurse. She became the head nurse of the nursing school in Hachinohe Red Cross Hospital which opened in the same year in Hachinohe and started to live in the residential hall together with her students.

=== Reform of nursing ===
In 1947, when the Association of Japanese Midwives, Nurses and Health Nurses (later Japanese Nursing Association) was established as one of the reforms of nursing by GHQ, she undertook the foundation of its branch in Aomori. Although she suffered from opposition by people who still had their old thoughts before WWII, Grace Elizabeth Alt (1905–1978), who was in Japan as a head nurse of the department of public health in GHQ, gave her a tremendous boost in it. Within the year, their hard work reached fruition and The Association of Japanese Midwives, Nurses, and Health Nurses in Aomori (later Aomori Prefectural Association of Nursing.) was established The following words from Alt to Hanada greatly encouraged her while struggling with the hardship because of postwar shortage in hospitals and in the education of nurses.

Education of nurses is possible with just two logs. The teacher sits on one of them, and the students sit on the other. Nurses in the world now after the war are in the similar situations. Remember when Nightingale established her Nursing School. It started with only 6 students. — quoted from Kaneko金子 1992, p. 268

In 1949, the outbreak of polio occurred in Hachinohe. The vaccine had not been developed in those days, and newspapers reported that phenomenon was a rare case in the world. Hanada, receiving the request from the doctor who was in charge of it, went to Tokyo for studying the treatment. She got the information materials of Kenny Method which was effective in Australia from GHQ with the help for JRCS. Curing people in Hachinohe Red Cross Hospital every day, she introduced the method to the public through newspaper articles.

In the reform of nursing at the postwar time, Hanada continued to studying American style nursing to find that education of nurses in Japan is far behind America. In order to have the society recognize nurses as a profession, she tried to establish an educational institute of nursing, following the Florence Nightingale Faculty of Nursing and Midwifery in London. Her desire was achieved by opening the Aomori-ken Koto Kango Gakuin (later Aomori University of Health and Welfare). However, there was only one applicant at first, which proved that Hanada's thought had hardly been accepted to the public yet. A newspaper article titled "Hated Prefectural College of Nursing" denounced her building an unnecessary, nonurgent school. She visited high schools around Aomori in order to attract students by introducing Florence Nightingale with her handmade picture-story shows and to explain the importance of nursing education. Thanks to her efforts, the school had 38 applicants the following year. Hanada also worked there as a teacher.

=== Actions in the Prefectural Government ===
Accompanying the establishment of this prefectural institute, the Nursing Unite of Medical Department was founded in Aomori Prefectural Government. Hanada was asked to be the unit chief because she was the very person who proposed to establish the educational institute. In 1950, a year before the College of Nursing opened, she quit the Hachinohe Red Cross Hospital and started to work in the Government. This post was the top hierarchy in the educational system of nursing in Aomori. The fact that a woman from outside of the Prefectural Government got the position of a unit chief for the first time attracted tremendous interest amongst mass media at that time, not only because women in those days rarely had a position title but also because even male officers with more than 10 years' experiences had difficulty in getting the position like hers.

In 1955, Hanada visited Iwate Prefecture to study the health action by Iwate National Health Insurance Organization regarding Society-Managed Health Insurance had been active for a long time outstandingly in Tohoku Area. After returning, she cooperated with the same organization in Aomori to contribute to spreading their actions. While working on it, she discussed the health problems with the residents to realize the need to send health nurses around Aomori, following the examples like Kochi where the problems had successfully been resolved.

In 1964, in order to resolve the infant mortality rate of Aomori that was the highest in Japan those days, Hanada started a campaign called "Mottara Korosuna Undo (the Never Kill If You Get Pregnant Campaign)" together with health nurses and midwives. She gave mothers bleached cotton to support their wombs if they notify their pregnancy to the Prefectural Government early for the purpose of raising awareness of not having fetuses die. This community-based campaign enabled health nurses to build relationships while visiting households steadily and honestly.

In those days, approximately half of all the towns or villages in Aomori, especially remote areas, had no health nurse because of difficult financial situations of such communities and lack of health nurses who hoped to work there. In order to resolve this problem, Haken Hoken-fu Seido (The Temporary Health Nurse System) devised by Hanada began in 1965. This system allowed graduates from Prefectural College of Nursing to be employed as officials of Aomori Prefecture and sent to each town or village with traveling expenses paid by the government. This system increased the number of health nurses who accepted to work for remote areas as their period of toleration for some years before going back to cities. Moreover, some of them married and settled in their places of appointment to keep working there. Although 29 towns and villages had no health nurse in 1962, the establishment of the system of sending at least 2 of them in these areas in 1971 allowed all areas in Aomori Prefecture to have health nurses. It is said that the maintenance of this system of health nursing was impossible without the leadership of both Hanada and Takeuchi Shunkichi, who was the local governor in those days and had similar experiences to Hanada as a war correspondent.

Hanada retired the Aomori Prefectural Government in 1973. Her position as the Health Nursing Supervisor at retirement was the highest of all female governors those days. She won the Public Health Award held by Dai-ichi Life Group in the same year, and To-o Award by To-o Daily Press in the following year.

=== Actions as a Health Nursing Researcher ===
After retiring the local government, Hanada worked as a freelance researcher of health nursing. In 1950, she got the position of the head of Aogiri-kai in Japan Red Cross in Aomori (hereafter Aogiri-kai), a mutual support organization composed of unmarried women who studied nursing in JRCS, where she made her active base. She actively accepted many requests of lectures and interviews.

In order to counter the threat from aging society, Hanada started Kango Ginko (Nursing Bank) organized by Aogiri-kai in 1980. The system was to have elderly people help work each other through the special tickets instead of money, where Hanada announced herself as the president. Although it was a pioneering system, it did not take its root in the society. In the following year, Aogiri-kai, the Association of Social Workers in Health Services of Aomori, and the Federation of Regional Women's Organization in Aomori cooperated starting telephone counseling services for senior citizens called "Koreisha 110 ban (number 110 for senior citizens)". This system developed later, resulting in organizing "Volunteer Ajisai", where the three organizations and the branch office of Japanese Nursing Association collaborate with each other. Hanada also worked as its caretaker.

In 1994, Hanada was nominated for Florence Nightingale Medal. Even though this is the most prestigious award in the world as a nurse, she rejected to receive it. She told the reason in the bulletin of Aogiri-kai titled Aogiri-kai Dayori as a previous military nurse and a person who experienced the WWII as below;

Then I got to have a belief; I have to tell and hand down the foolishness of wars throughout my life. I have to live together with the spirits of many people who were killed in the war. As a person in the generation involved in the war, I will not forget the feeling of atonement. If I should have a chance to receive any award as a person who participated in the war, I will reject it. — Quoted from Matsuoka松岡 2010, pp. 138–139

Within the same year, she self-published the collection of her war stories as a military nurse, Kataritsugitai (I Want To Hand This Down). Also in 1997, she published the Tanka collection titled Oki Nao Kiezu (Fire Has Not Yet Disappeared), hoping to tell many people her experiences of the war. It was hard to transmit experiences of the war as memories of it was gradually fading after half a century of the postwar period. Despite that, she continued to self-publishing her war stories and sent them to her friends.

=== Late life ===
In 1998, Hanada resigned the head of Aogiri-kai on account of old age. She stayed away from people who were in close relationships before, only keeping in touch with them by exchanging letters. It is said this was because she did not like to show old and weak herself to people.

In 2006, Hanada died for the liver cancer at the age of 91. She was unmarried throughout her life because she lost the chance because of the war. Based on her will, her body was given to the Faculty of Medicine in Hirosaki University and the funeral was not held. Her last words as a pacifist, which was sent to her younger brother, was published in her obituary in To-o Daily Press and impressed the readers.

I believe the spirits of 3150 thousand people who were killed in that war transformed into the Constitution of Japan. As the shield of not fighting and not being involved in wars in the future, I deeply pray this article 9 in the peace Constitution will be protected. — Matsuoka 松岡 2010, pp. 8–9

== Evaluation ==
Hanada and Satoe Kamimura, who led health nursing in Kochi Prefecture in Showa era, were called "Miki Hanada in Aomori for the East, Satoe Kamimura in Kochi for the West". They were also called "Emperor Kamimura for the West, Emperor Hanada for the East" by people who engaged in nursing in those days because of their leadership and humanity. Compared with Kamimura, Hanada is remarkable in that she seriously regarded the action by local residents and labor movement by health nurses. This is because of their different career experiences; when Kamimura started to work as a health nurse, the purpose of the work had already been unified for cooperation in the all-out war, while Hanada had been an expert in nursing activities before the unique health nursing system in Aomori Prefecture started.

On the other hand, since she regarded the residents and labors seriously, she often clashed not only with the administration when working for the hospital but also with the top management and the government when working for Aomori Prefectural Government. When she tried to improve the working condition of nurses in the hospital, the doctors taunted her to be so Americanized. When the innovative councilors criticized the way of governing health nursing in Aomori prefectural assembly, the false rumor that Hanada stirred them to do it flew. Hanada herself was severely told off by her boss even though she knew nothing. She also clashed with her boss when tackling on the health nursing in remote areas, which made her write resignation letters several times. It is said that she endured these hardships remembering the encouragement across the border by Grace Elizabeth Alt in GHQ.

The previous nurses in Hachinohe Red Cross Hospital describe Hanada as a person who always thought of nurses as their head in the prewar era when the social position of women was low and working women were received prejudice;

The head nurse Hanada was the one who regarded seriously the improvement of nurses' position and the model of nurses in the society. She claimed that we must improve ourselves as working women and that we should honor ourselves as professional nurses. [...] I heard there was much disagreement between her and the director of the hospital and chief secretary. But there is no reform without clashes. Hanada was the one who carried it out. — Matsuoka 松岡 2010, p. 80

The head nurse Hanada was said to be a leftist because she tried to reform nursing. She, a human who was called the head nurse Hanada, was the representative of us nurses. — Matsuoka松岡 2010, p. 80

One of Hanada's students in Aomori-ken Koto Kango Gakuin, who later worked as a professor in Aomori University of Health and Welfare, Faculty of Health Science, Department of Nursing, told the feature of her lectures like below;

Miss. Hanada lectured really impressively. She told about health and lives of local people as well as about protecting daily life based on her own experiences. This made her lectures really vigorous. She frequently told us about the war. [...] What she told us was quite real [...]. — Matsuoka松岡 2010, p. 194

The Chief of public health department of Aomori Prefectural Government in those days called her "giant", evaluating her activities there like below;

There is something different in her point of view from other officers. Before working in the Prefectural Government, she belonged to the military and Hachinohe Red Cross Hospital, where she took care of seriously ill people and went through many dreadful scenes. Because of these, she had the developed eyes to see the reality. [...] She was very assertive in both planning and negotiation. She should be suitable for an administrative officer. — Matsuoka松岡 2010, p. 135

"Mottara Korosuna Undo" promoted by her in Aomori Prefectural Government was worth Nobel Prize in that the campaign remarkably contributed to the reduction of infant death rates by improving the local nursing services. However, there were contrary opinions that the word "Korosuna (Never kill)" was too direct and shocking for a slogan. Additionally, some criticized distributing bleached cotton as bribing women with stuff they want, others insisted that Aomori Prefecture was regarded as the representative of backward prefecture because the bleached cotton was thought to be out of date.

The system to send health nurses formulated by Hanada in the following year called "Aomori Method" was paid a special attention to and highly evaluated all over Japan. After this system was established, no town or village suffered from the tough situation without health medical services. Despite that, the system was hard to be accepted by the personnel department and the general affairs department in the prefectural government because it had to employ health nurses, who each town and village normally should have employed by themselves.

The "Nurse Bank", which she formulated as the resolution of aging society after retiring the prefectural government, was paid much attention to by mass media since the system was pioneering. However, the reason for its unsuccess is indicated as following; that it was not the right time; that the leader had already retired the official; and that she lacked people who could always assist her. Despite that, both the Association of Social Workers in Health Services of Aomori and the Federation of Regional Women's Organization in Aomori were interested in the "Nurse Bank" as a supportive system for aged people, joining "Koreisha 110 ban" which had the same purpose.

"Koreisha 110 ban" was reputed to make multiplier effects on account of cooperation of three different types of associations and organizations. Some customers those says made full use of the counseling service, talking for 40 minutes. It was rare in those days for several different parties to cooperate with each other but Hanada bridged them with her caring personality, according to the vice president of the Association of Social workers in Health Services of Aomori at the time. The Social Welfare Council in Aomori has the similar service "Fukushi Anshin Denwa (Welfare and Security Hot Line)", whose predecessor is "Koreisha 110 ban" run by Hanada.
