= Miki Satō =

Miki Satō may refer to:

- Miki Satō (actress) (佐藤 美貴, born 1980), Japanese actress
- Miki Satō (singer) (佐藤 ミキ), Japanese musician
- Miki Sato (television personality) (佐藤 美希, born 1993), Japanese television personality
