= Shizugawa Station =

Former railway station in Minamisanriku, Miyagi Prefecture, Japan

Coordinates: 38°40′41″N 141°26′35″E

Shizugawa 志津川
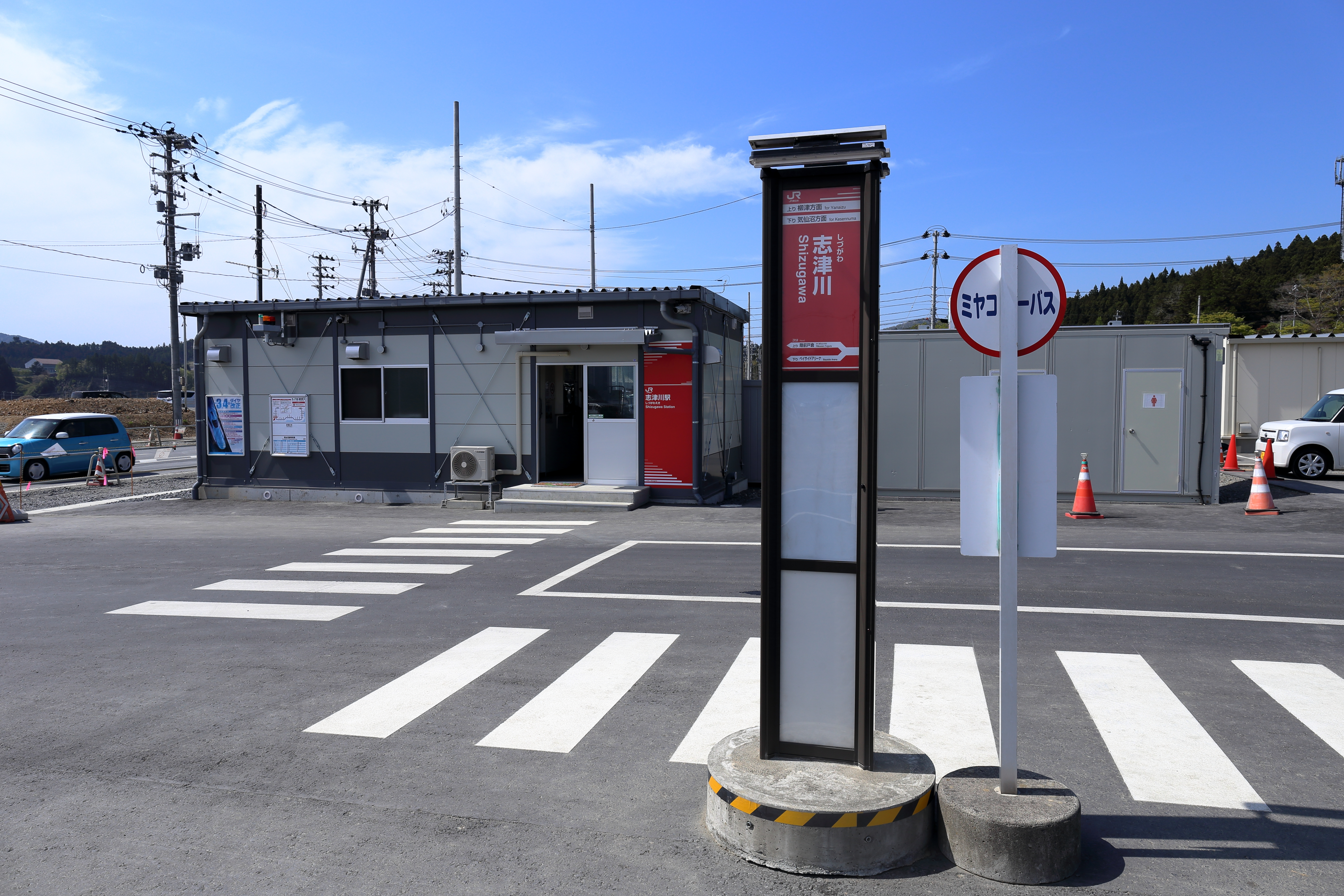
- Shizugawa BRT Station

General information
- Location: Shizugawa-aze Nakatsu-machi 32-6, Minamisanriku, Motoyoshi, Miyagi （宮城県南三陸町志津川字中瀬町32-6） Japan
- Operator: JR East
- Line: ■ Kesennuma Line

History
- Opened: 1977

Passengers
- FY 2010: 269 daily

Services
Preceding station	JR East	Following station
Rikuzen-Togura towards Maeyachi	Kesennuma / Ōfunato BRT	Minamisanriku Town Hall / Hospital towards Sakari

Former services
Preceding station	JR East	Following station
Rikuzen-Togura towards Kogota	Kesennuma Line	Shizuhama towards Kesennuma
Location

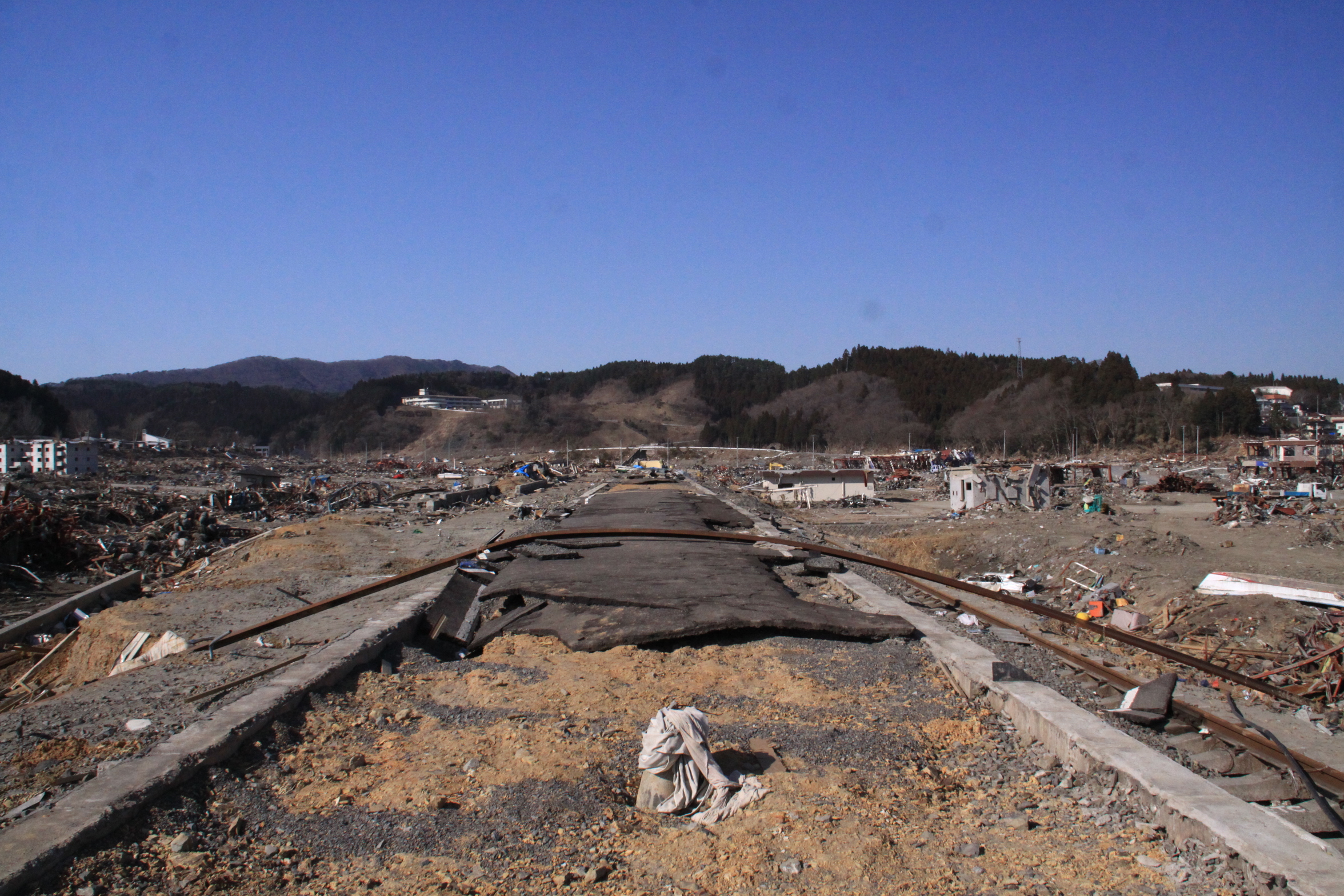
Shizugawa Station after the 2011 earthquake

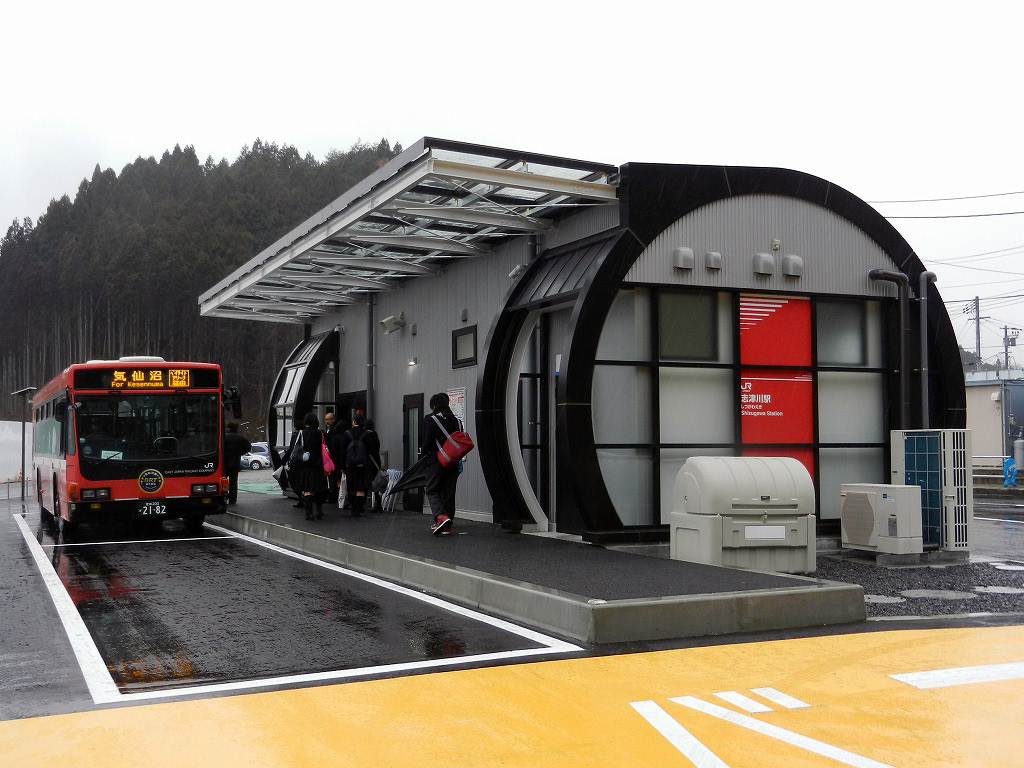
Shizugawa BRT station

Shizugawa Station (志津川駅, Shizugawa-eki) was a JR East railway station located in Minamisanriku, Miyagi Prefecture, Japan. The station was destroyed by the 2011 Tōhoku earthquake and tsunami. Services have now been replaced by a provisional bus rapid transit line.

== Lines ==
Shizugawa Station was served by the Kesennuma Line, and was located 33.7 rail kilometers from the terminus of the line at Maeyachi Station.

== Station layout ==
Shizugawa Station had a single side platform and a single island platform serving two tracks, and connected to the station building by a level crossing.

== History ==
Shizugawa Station opened on 11 December 1977. The station was absorbed into the JR East network upon the privatization of the Japan National Railways (JNR) on April 1, 1987. Operations were discontinued after the station was completely destroyed by the 2011 Tōhoku earthquake and tsunami and an iconic video on the internet recorded from the Shizugawa High School shows the station being flattened as well as the tracks and other nearby buildings before being pouring down to a flat area towards a neighborhood. Today rail services have now been replaced by a bus rapid transit line.

== Surrounding area ==
- Japan National Route 45
- former Shizugawa Town Hall
- Sode Beach Ocean Swimming Area
