= Rikuzen-Minato Station =

Former railway station in Minamisanriku, Miyagi Prefecture, Japan

Coordinates: 38°44′19″N 141°31′51″E

Rikuzen-Minato 陸前港
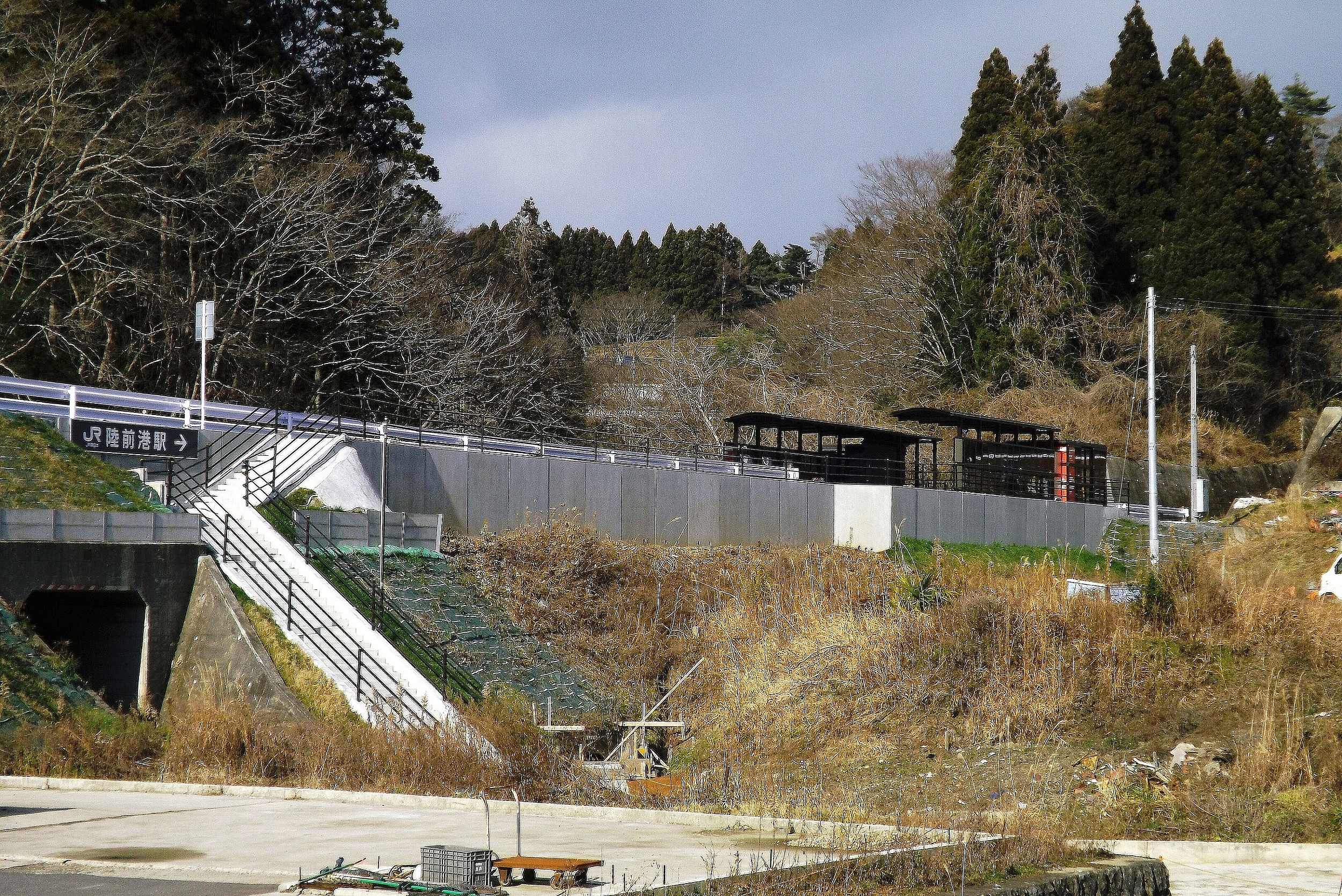
- Rikuzen-Minato Station in December 2013

General information
- Location: Utatsu-aze Minato 116, Minamisanriku, Motoyoshi, Miyagi （宮城県本吉郡南三陸町歌津字港240） Japan
- Operator: JR East
- Line: Kesennuma Line

History
- Opened: 1977

Services
Preceding station	JR East	Following station
Utatsu towards Maeyachi	Kesennuma / Ōfunato BRT	Kurauchi towards Sakari
Location

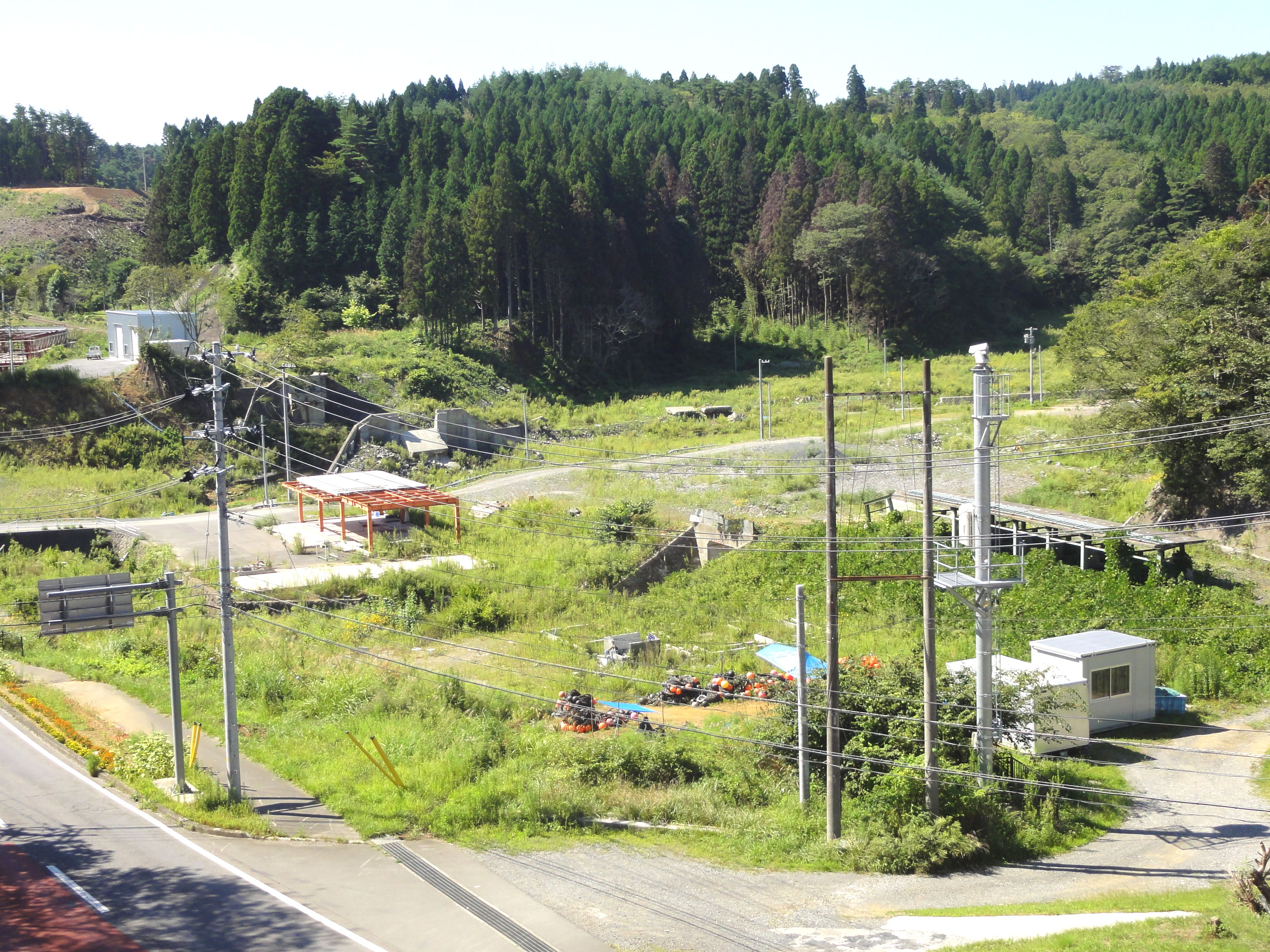
Rikuzen-Minato Station after the 2011 earthquake

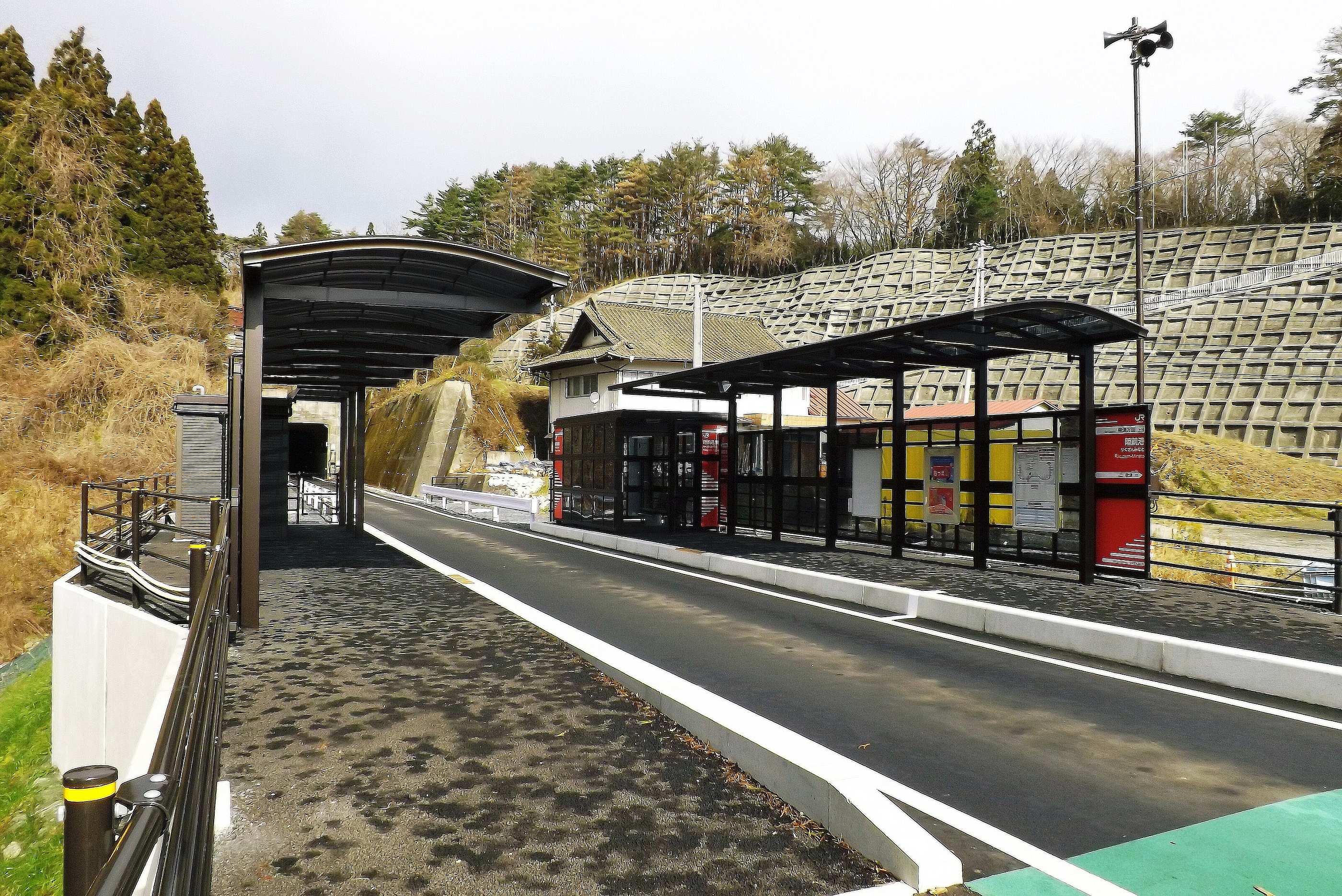
BRT station in December 2012

Rikuzen-Minato Station (陸前港駅, Rikuzen-Minato-eki) was a JR East railway station located in Minamisanriku, Miyagi Prefecture, Japan. The station was completely destroyed by the 2011 Tōhoku earthquake and tsunami, and services have now been replaced by a provisional bus rapid transit line.

== Lines ==
Rikuzen-Minato Station was served by the Kesennuma Line, and was located 44.9 rail kilometers from the terminus of the line at Maeyachi Station.

== Station layout ==
Rikuzen-Minato Station had a single side platform serving traffic in both directions. The station was unattended.

== History ==
Rikuzen-Minato Station opened on 11 December 1977. The station was absorbed into the JR East network upon the privatization of the Japan National Railways (JNR) on April 1, 1987. Operations were discontinued after the station was severely damaged by the 2011 Tōhoku earthquake and tsunami, and rail services have now been replaced by a bus rapid transit line.

== Surrounding area ==
- Japan National Route 45
