= Utatsu Station =

Former railway station in Minamisanriku, Miyagi Prefecture, Japan

Coordinates: 38°43′04″N 141°31′09″E

Utatsu 歌津
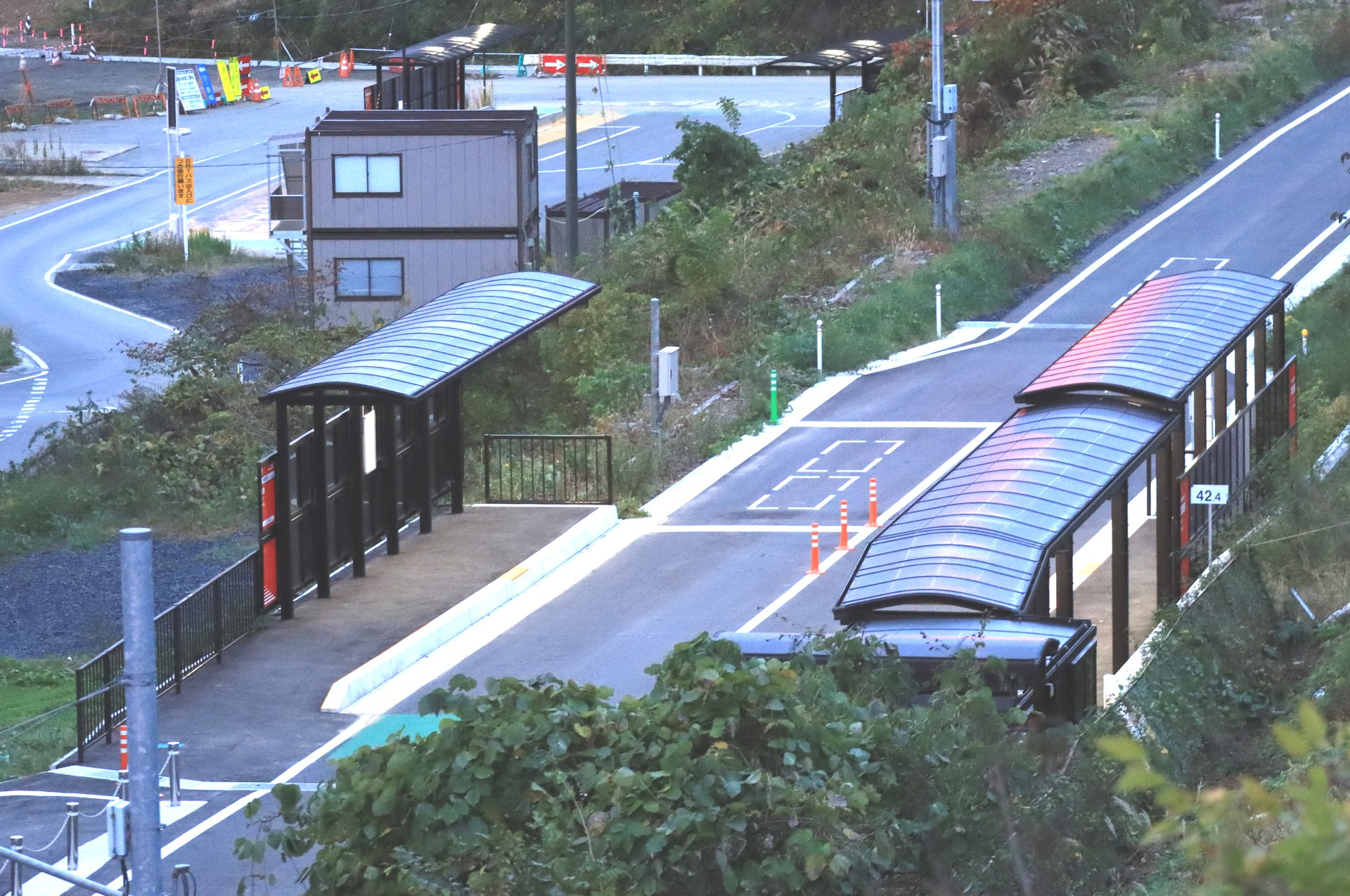
- Utatsu Station in 2019

General information
- Location: Utatsu-aze Isatomae 186, Minamisanriku, Motoyoshi, Miyagi （宮城県南三陸町歌津字伊里前189） Japan
- Operator: JR East
- Line: Kesennuma Line

History
- Opened: 1977

Services
Preceding station	JR East	Following station
Shizuhama towards Maeyachi	Kesennuma / Ōfunato BRT	Rikuzen-Minato towards Sakari
Location

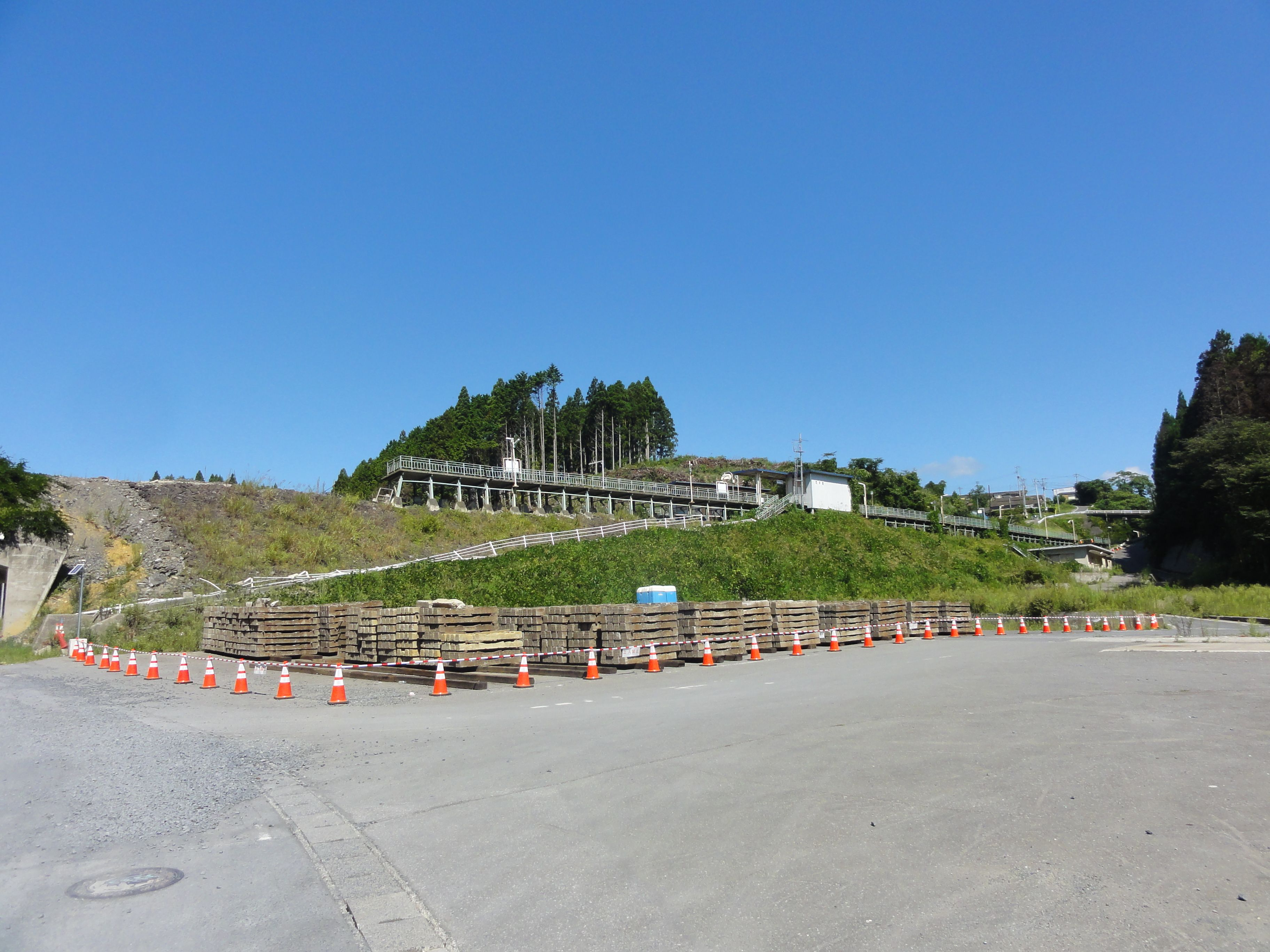
Utatsu Station after the 2011 earthquake

Utatsu Station (歌津駅, Utatsu-eki) was a JR East railway station located in Minamisanriku, Miyagi Prefecture, Japan. The blue-roofed station platform remained standing after the 2011 tsunami, however the adjacent railway bridge and track (southwest of the station) collapsed. Services have now been replaced by a provisional bus rapid transit line.

== Lines ==
Utatsu Station was served by the Kesennuma Line, and was located 42.3 rail kilometers from the terminus of the line at Maeyachi Station.

== Station layout ==
Utatsu Station had two opposed side platforms connected by a level crossing. The station was unattended.

== History ==
Utatsu Station opened on 11 December 1977. The station was absorbed into the JR East network upon the privatization of the Japan National Railways (JNR) on April 1, 1987. Operations were discontinued after the station was severely damaged by the 2011 Tōhoku earthquake and tsunami, and rail services have now been replaced by a bus rapid transit line.

== Surrounding area ==
- Japan National Route 45
- Utatsu Town Hall
- Utatsu Peninsula Fishdragon Fossil Discovery Area
