= Miki (surname) =

Miki (written: 三木 lit. "three trees") is a Japanese surname. Notable people with the surname include:

- Honoka Miki (born 1997), Japanese actress
- Minoru Miki (1930–2011), Japanese composer and artistic director
- Mutsuko Miki (1917–2012), Japanese activist who advocated on behalf of pacifism, official compensation for comfort women, and improved Japan–North Korea relations, wife of Japanese Prime Minister Takeo Miki
- Shinichiro Miki (born 1968), Japanese voice actor
- Shunsuke Miki (三木 俊介; born 1944), Japanese rower
- Tsubaki Miki (born 2003), Japanese snowboarder
- Takeo Miki (1907–1988), 66th Prime Minister of Japan
- Taku Miki (1935–2023), writer
- Takuya Miki (born 1989), Japanese wheelchair tennis player
- Yoshio Miki (三木 義雄; 1905–?), Japanese hurdler
- Saint Paul Miki (パウロ三木), Japanese Catholic Saint and martyr.

== Fictional characters ==
- Sayaka Miki, a character in the anime series Puella Magi Madoka Magica
