= Minamisanriku =

Minamisanriku 南三陸町
- Town
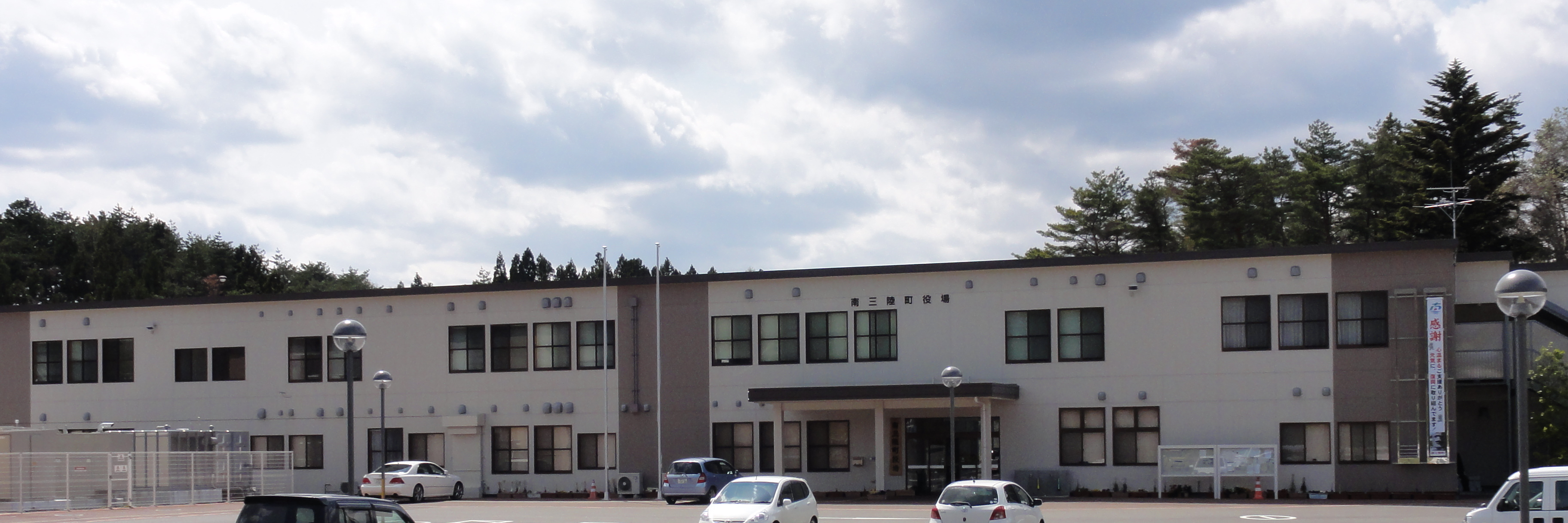
- Minamisanriku Town Hall, May 2013

- Flag Seal

- Location of Minamisanriku in Miyagi Prefecture

- Coordinates: 38°40′45.6″N 141°27′38.8″E
- Country: Japan
- Region: Tōhoku
- Prefecture: Miyagi
- District: Motoyoshi

Area
  - Total: 163.40 km^{2} (63.09 sq mi)

Population (October 10, 2020)
  - Total: 12,225
  - Density: 74.816/km^{2} (193.77/sq mi)
- Time zone: UTC+09:00 (Japan Standard Time)
- Tree: Persera thunbergii
- Flower: Azalea
- Bird: Golden eagle
- Fish: Common octopus
- Color: sky blue
- Address: 77 Shioiri, Shizugawa, Minamisanriku-cho, Motoyoshi-gun Miyagi-ken 986-0792
- Climate: Cfa
- Website: Official website

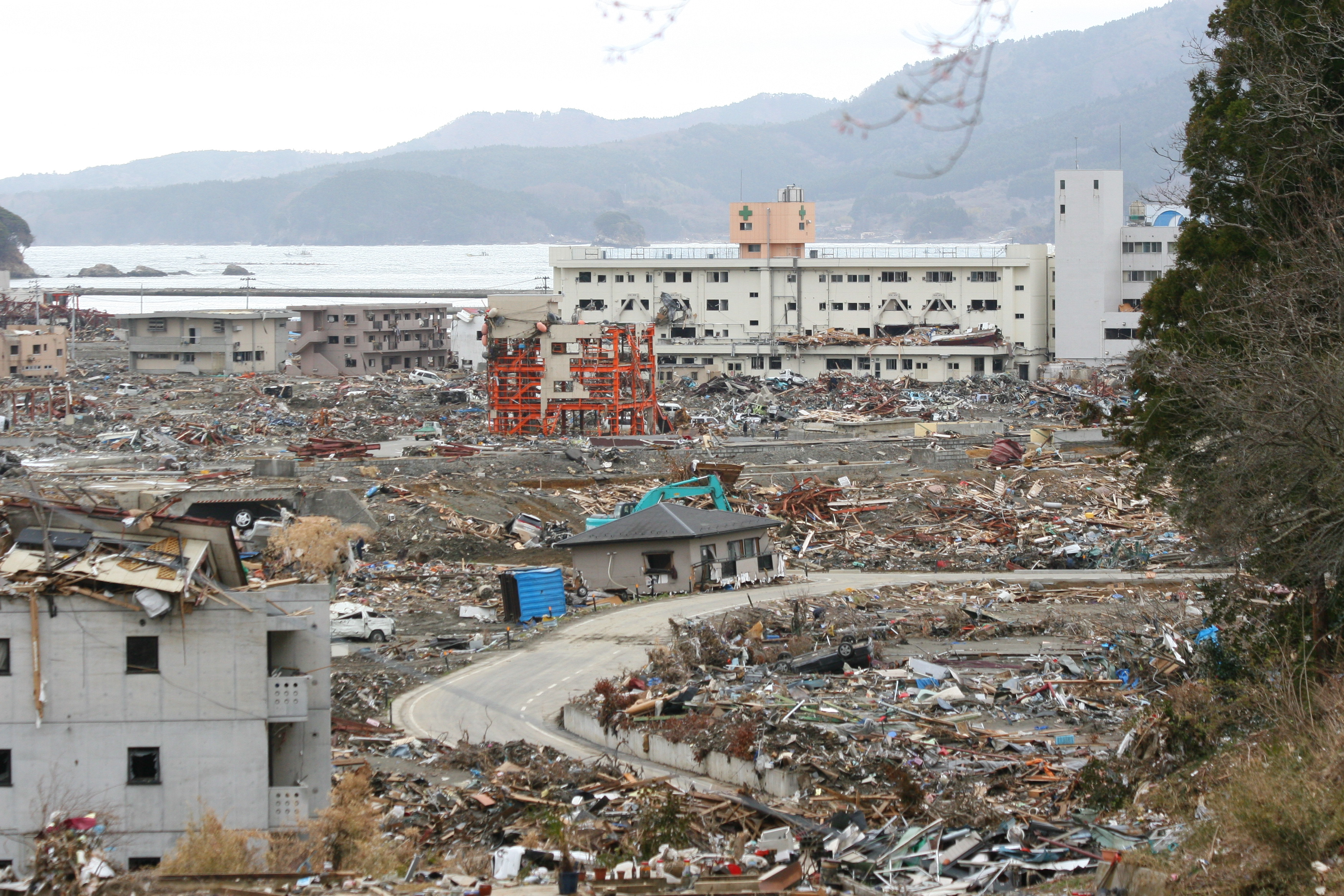
Around Shizugawa Public Hospital in Minamisanriku after the 2011 tsunami

Minamisanriku (南三陸町, Minamisanriku-chō) is a town in Miyagi Prefecture, Japan. As of 1 May 2020, it had an estimated population of 12,516, and a population density of 77 persons per km^{2} in 4504 households. The total area of the town is 163.40 square kilometres (63.09 sq mi). It is a resort town on a coastline of wooded islands and mountainous inlets, large sections of which suffered from damage due to the 2011 Tōhoku earthquake and tsunami.

== Geography ==
Minamisanriku is in the far northeastern corner of Miyagi Prefecture. Its coastline is part of the Sanriku Fukkō National Park, which stretches north to Aomori Prefecture. The town is bordered to the north, west, and south by the Kitakami Mountains. About 70% of the area of the town is forested.

=== Climate ===
Minamisanriku has a humid subtropical climate (Köppen climate classification Cfa) characterized by warm humid summers and cold winters. The average annual temperature in Mutsu is 11.4 °C (52.5 °F). The average annual rainfall is 1,302.3 mm (51.27 in) with September as the wettest month. The temperatures are highest on average in August, at around 23.0 °C (73.4 °F), and lowest in January, at around 0.7 °C (33.3 °F).

Climate data for Shizugawa, Minamisanriku (1991−2020 normals, extremes 1976−present)
Month	Jan	Feb	Mar	Apr	May	Jun	Jul	Aug	Sep	Oct	Nov	Dec	Year
Record high °C (°F)	16.2 (61.2)	19.6 (67.3)	23.8 (74.8)	30.2 (86.4)	33.5 (92.3)	34.2 (93.6)	36.3 (97.3)	38.0 (100.4)	35.7 (96.3)	28.7 (83.7)	23.5 (74.3)	20.5 (68.9)	38.0 (100.4)
Mean daily maximum °C (°F)	5.4 (41.7)	6.3 (43.3)	9.8 (49.6)	15.1 (59.2)	19.4 (66.9)	22.1 (71.8)	25.5 (77.9)	27.3 (81.1)	24.2 (75.6)	19.3 (66.7)	13.8 (56.8)	7.9 (46.2)	16.3 (61.4)
Daily mean °C (°F)	0.7 (33.3)	1.2 (34.2)	4.2 (39.6)	9.2 (48.6)	14.0 (57.2)	17.5 (63.5)	21.4 (70.5)	23.0 (73.4)	19.8 (67.6)	14.2 (57.6)	8.4 (47.1)	3.1 (37.6)	11.4 (52.5)
Mean daily minimum °C (°F)	−3.1 (26.4)	−3.0 (26.6)	−0.6 (30.9)	3.8 (38.8)	9.2 (48.6)	13.8 (56.8)	18.3 (64.9)	19.8 (67.6)	16.2 (61.2)	9.8 (49.6)	3.5 (38.3)	−0.9 (30.4)	7.2 (45.0)
Record low °C (°F)	−12.3 (9.9)	−12.5 (9.5)	−8.1 (17.4)	−4.4 (24.1)	0.2 (32.4)	4.5 (40.1)	9.5 (49.1)	12.5 (54.5)	6.7 (44.1)	−0.5 (31.1)	−4.7 (23.5)	−9.6 (14.7)	−12.5 (9.5)
Average precipitation mm (inches)	45.3 (1.78)	39.2 (1.54)	88.6 (3.49)	103.3 (4.07)	116.7 (4.59)	130.7 (5.15)	167.3 (6.59)	142.8 (5.62)	184.2 (7.25)	155.3 (6.11)	70.7 (2.78)	54.2 (2.13)	1,302.3 (51.27)
Average precipitation days (≥ 1.0 mm)	6.1	6.2	8.4	9.0	10.2	11.0	13.1	11.1	11.3	9.0	7.5	7.1	110
Mean monthly sunshine hours	171.9	171.4	192.3	199.5	199.7	157.9	139.9	161.1	137.9	155.6	158.6	153.4	1,997.1
Source: Japan Meteorological Agency

=== Neighboring municipalities ===
Miyagi Prefecture

- Ishinomaki
- Kesennuma
- Tome

== Demographics ==
Per Japanese census data, the population of Minamisanriku peaked in the 1950s and has declined steadily over the past 70 years.

Historical population
Year	Pop.	±%
1920	17,054	—
1930	18,410	+8.0%
1940	19,496	+5.9%
1950	25,168	+29.1%
1960	24,852	−1.3%
1970	22,943	−7.7%
1980	22,243	−3.1%
1990	21,401	−3.8%
2000	19,860	−7.2%
2010	17,429	−12.2%
2020	12,225	−29.9%

== History ==
The area of present-day Minamisanriku was part of ancient Mutsu Province and came under the control of the Date clan of Sendai Domain during the Edo period, under the Tokugawa shogunate. The area has suffered from the effects of tsunami since ancient times, including the 869 Sanriku earthquake, and more recently during the 1896 Sanriku earthquake and the 1933 Sanriku earthquake. The 1896 earthquake resulted in the highest tsunami wave ever recorded in Japan at 38.2 metres (125.3 ft), until it was surpassed by a 40.4 metres (132.5 ft) wave at Miyako in the 2011 Tōhoku earthquake and tsunami.

The villages of Shizugawa and Utatsu were established on June 1, 1889, with the establishment of the modern municipalities system. Shizugawa was elevated to town status on October 31, 1895, and Utatsu on April 1, 1959. The town was formed through a merger on October 1, 2005, when the towns of Shizugawa and Utatsu, both from Motoyoshi District, merged to form the new town of Minamisanriku.

The 1960 Valdivia earthquake triggered a tsunami that crossed the Pacific Ocean and struck the town of Shizugawa with a height of up to 2.8 metres (9.2 ft), causing extensive damage. As a result, two-story-high harbor walls were built by 1963, and residents held tsunami drills each year on the anniversary. To mark the 30th anniversary of the disaster in 1990, a bilingual Spanish-Japanese plaque was installed, with a message from President Patricio Aylwin of Chile, accompanied by a replica moai statue.

The harbor walls proved ineffective in the 2011 tsunami, which washed over four-story buildings.

The 2010 Chile earthquake caused a 1.3-metre (4.3 ft) tsunami in Minamisanriku.

=== 2011 earthquake and tsunami disaster ===
Immediate aftermath accounts suggested 95 percent of the town was destroyed by the 2011 Japanese tsunami that followed the 2011 Tōhoku earthquake. Only the tallest buildings remained, and roughly half the population was unaccounted for during the days following the disaster; only 9,700 people were confirmed alive and evacuated in the first week. In late June 2011, a total of 1,206 were counted as dead or missing, according to the Kahoku Shinpou.

The town had two evacuation centers where residents could go in the event of a tsunami, one on the southern headland overlooking the town, the other back from the center of the town. Although both were 20 meters above sea level, the tsunami inundated them and washed people away. At least 31 of the town's 80 designated evacuation sites were inundated by the tsunami. The average height of the tsunami in Minamisanriku was around 45 feet (14 m) above the sea-level, with the highest watermark recorded at 67.3 feet (20.5 m) just southwest of the city center.

According to an English teacher at the high school on a hill above the tsunami, "The entire town was simply swept away. It just no longer exists. There were around 7,000 of us on the hill that day. Perhaps a few thousand at the school on the hill opposite. But there are 17,000 in the town. All the others have gone." Since the schools were all on high ground, many children were orphaned. Survivors wrote "SOS" in white lettering, in the playing field of Shizugawa High School.

When the earthquake struck, the mayor, Jin Sato (佐藤仁), was talking at the town assembly about the much smaller tsunami caused by the March 9 foreshock of the March 11 earthquake. The three-story building of the town's Crisis Management Department (防災対策庁舎, Bōsai Taisaku Chōsha) which Sato escaped to was submerged by the tsunami. Out of the 130 people who worked at the town hall, Sato was one of 53 who reached the roof and one of 10 who survived. He returned to government affairs, founding the headquarters for disaster control at the Bayside Arena in Miyagi on March 13, 2011.

Shizugawa Hospital was one of the few major buildings that survived the tsunami. It was partly inundated, and 74 out of 109 patients died. Close to 200 people were rescued from the roof.

Miki Endo, a 25-year-old employed by the town's Crisis Management Department to voice disaster advisories and warnings, was hailed in the Japanese news media as a heroine for sacrificing her life by continuing to broadcast warnings and alerts over the community loudspeaker system, in the Crisis Management Department's building, as the tsunami overwhelmed it. She was credited with saving many lives. The three-story headquarters of the department remained standing but was completely gutted, with only a red-colored steel skeleton remaining. In the aftermath of the disaster, Endo was missing and was later confirmed to have died. Photos show the roof of the building completely submerged at the height of the inundation, with some people clinging to the rooftop antenna. The surviving steel frame, with bent sections being kept intact as a reminder of the damage the building sustained, has been preserved during the city's recovery. A new sea wall is also currently under construction in Minamisanriku, and other landmarks, such as the town's seafood market, have also been rebuilt. The market was one of the first amenities in the town to reopen, initially in a temporary location inside a large tent; as much of the town's fishing fleet was damaged, destroyed or swept away by the tsunami, residents banded together, sharing supplies and boats as part of a joint effort to resume the town's fishing industry.

=== International response ===
The town is the site of the first field hospital established by an outside nation offering assistance following the disaster. An initial team of five doctors from Israel set up a surgery in preparation for a larger team once needs were assessed. A 53-member delegation of medical personnel from the Home Front Command and the IDF's Medical Corps opened a field hospital near Minamisanriku on March 29. The clinic included surgical, pediatrics and maternity wards, and an intensive care unit, pharmacy and laboratory along with 62 tons of medical supplies. The clinic was active in treating patients immediately upon opening.

On 23 April 2011, the Prime Minister of Australia, Julia Gillard, visited Minamisanriku.

== Economy ==
Minamisanriku relies heavily on tourism and commercial fishing as mainstays of the local economy.

== Education ==
Minamisanriku has five public elementary schools and two public middle schools operated by the town government and one public high school operated by the Miyagi Prefectural Board of Education.

== Transportation ==
=== Railway ===
East Japan Railway Company (JR East) - Kesennuma Line (Suspended indefinitely and replace by a BRT service)

- Rikuzen-Togura - Shizugawa -Shizuhama - Utatsu - Rikuzen-Minato - Kurauchi

=== Highway ===
- Sanriku Expressway
- National Route 45
- National Route 398

== Local attractions ==
- Daio-ji, Buddhist temple
- Mount Tatsugane
- Tubakishima (National Natural Monument)

== Sister cities ==
- Besano, Lombardy, Italy, since November 7, 1999
- Shōnai, Yamagata, Japan, since October 13, 1999
