= Miki's Law =

Kansas law to protect people from felons

Miki's Law is a law passed in Kansas, United States in 2006, named after Mikiala "Miki" Martinez, a 19-year-old resident of Great Bend, who was fatally shot in 2004. The law creates a registry of people convicted of felonies using a handgun or other deadly weapons, so that law enforcement and the public can know when a somebody with one of these convictions moves to their area.
