= Nonodake Station =

Railway station in Wakuya, Miyagi Prefecture, Japan

Nonodake Station のの岳駅
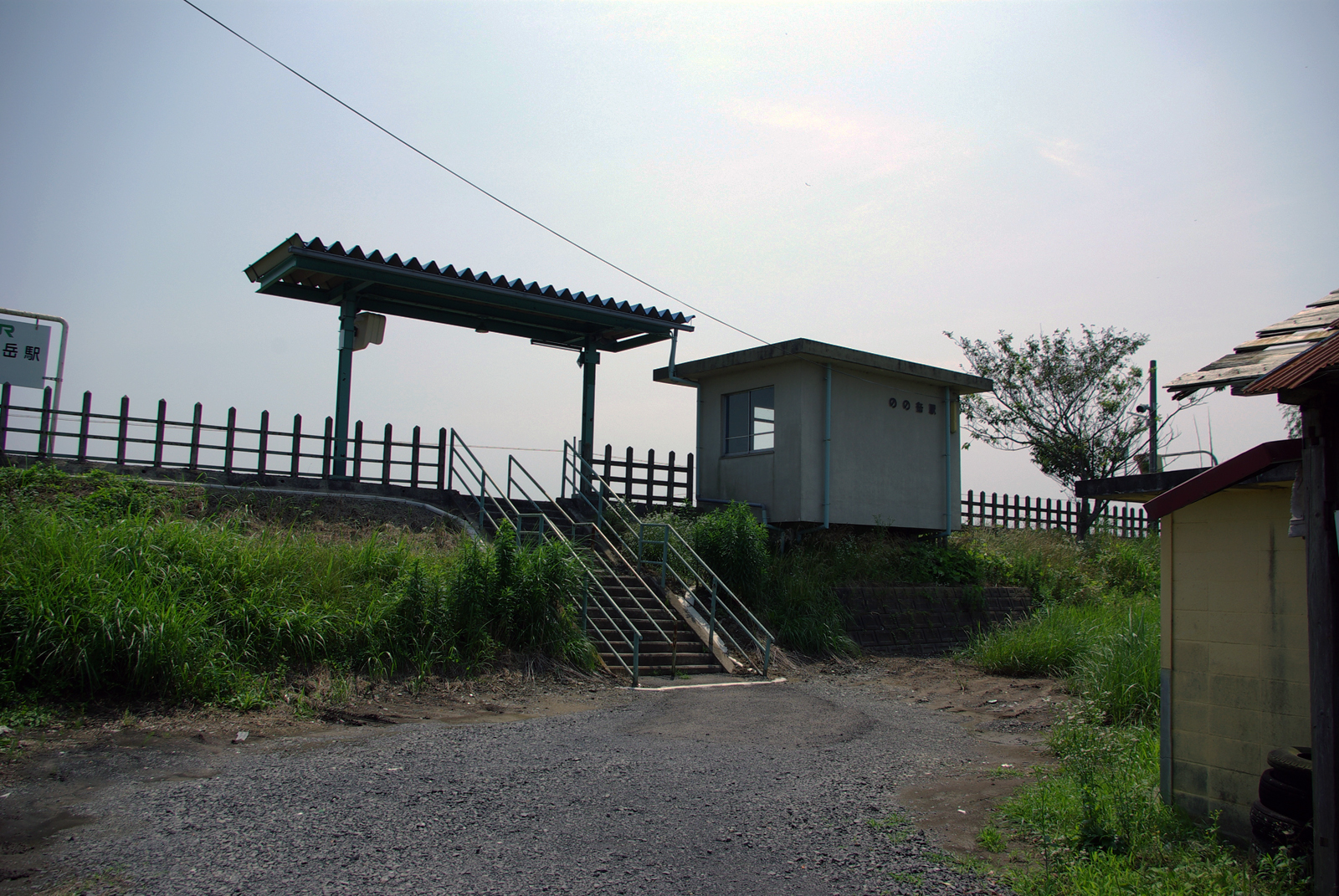
- Nonodake Station in August 2009

General information
- Location: Inookatandai-aze Otani, Wakuya-machi, Tōda-gun Miyagi-ken 987-0284; Japan
- Coordinates: 38°33′10″N 141°13′33″E
- Operator: JR East
- Line: ■ Kesennuma Line
- Distance: 6.2 km from Maeyachi
- Platforms: 1 side platform
- Tracks: 1

Construction
- Structure type: At grade

Other information
- Status: Unstaffed
- Website: Official website

History
- Opened: 24 October 1968

Passengers
- FY2015: 7 daily

Services
Preceding station	JR East	Following station
Wabuchi towards Kogota	Kesennuma Line	Rikuzen-Toyosato towards Yanaizu
Location
- Location within Miyagi Prefecture Location within Japan

Nonodake Station (のの岳駅, Nonodake-eki) is a railway station located in the town of Wakuya, Miyagi Prefecture, Japan, operated by the East Japan Railway Company (JR East).

== Lines ==
Nonodake Station is served by the Kesennuma Line, and is located 6.2 rail kilometers from the terminus of the line at Maeyachi Station.

== Station layout ==
The station has one ground-level side platform serving a single bi-directional track. The station is unattended.

== History ==
Nonodake Station opened on 24 October 1968. The station was absorbed into the JR East network upon the privatization of the Japan National Railways (JNR) on 1 April 1987.

== Passenger statistics ==
In fiscal 2015, the station was used by an average of 7 passengers daily (boarding passengers only).

== Surrounding area ==
- former Kitakami River

== See also ==
- List of railway stations in Japan
