= Rikuzen-Toyosato Station =

Railway station in Tome, Miyagi Prefecture, Japan

Rikuzen-Toyosato Station 陸前豊里駅
- Rikuzen-Toyosato Station in August 2026

General information
- Location: Kamiyaura 16, Tome-shi, Miyagi-ken 987-0366; Japan
- Coordinates: 38.5824°N 141.2449°E
- Operator: JR East
- Line: ■ Kesennuma Line
- Distance: 10.3 km from Maeyachi
- Platforms: 1 island platform
- Tracks: 2

Construction
- Structure type: At grade

Other information
- Status: Staffed
- Website: Official website

History
- Opened: October 24, 1968

Passengers
- FY2018: 103 daily

Services
Preceding station	JR East	Following station
Nonodake towards Kogota	Kesennuma Line	Mitakedō towards Yanaizu
Location
- Location within Miyagi Prefecture Location within Japan

Rikuzen-Toyosato Station (陸前豊里駅, Rikuzen-Toyosato-eki) is a railway station located in the city of Tome, Miyagi Prefecture, Japan operated by the East Japan Railway Company (JR East).

== Lines ==
Rikuzen-Toyosato Station is served by the Kesennuma Line, and is located 10.3 rail kilometers from the terminus of the line at Maeyachi Station.

== Station layout ==
The station has a single island platform connected to the station building by a footbridge. The station is staffed.

=== Platforms ===
1	■ Kesennuma Line	for Maeyachi and Kogota
2	■ Kesennuma Line	for Yanaizu

== History ==
Rikuzen-Toyosato Station opened on October 24, 1968. The station was absorbed into the JR East network upon the privatization of the Japan National Railways (JNR) on April 1, 1987.

== Passenger statistics ==
In fiscal 2016, the station was used by an average of 103 passengers daily (boarding passengers only).

== Surrounding area ==
- Rikuzen-Toyosato Post Office
- former Toyosato Town Hall

== See also ==
- List of railway stations in Japan
