= Mitakedō Station =

Railway station in Tome, Miyagi Prefecture, Japan

Mitakedō Station 御岳堂駅
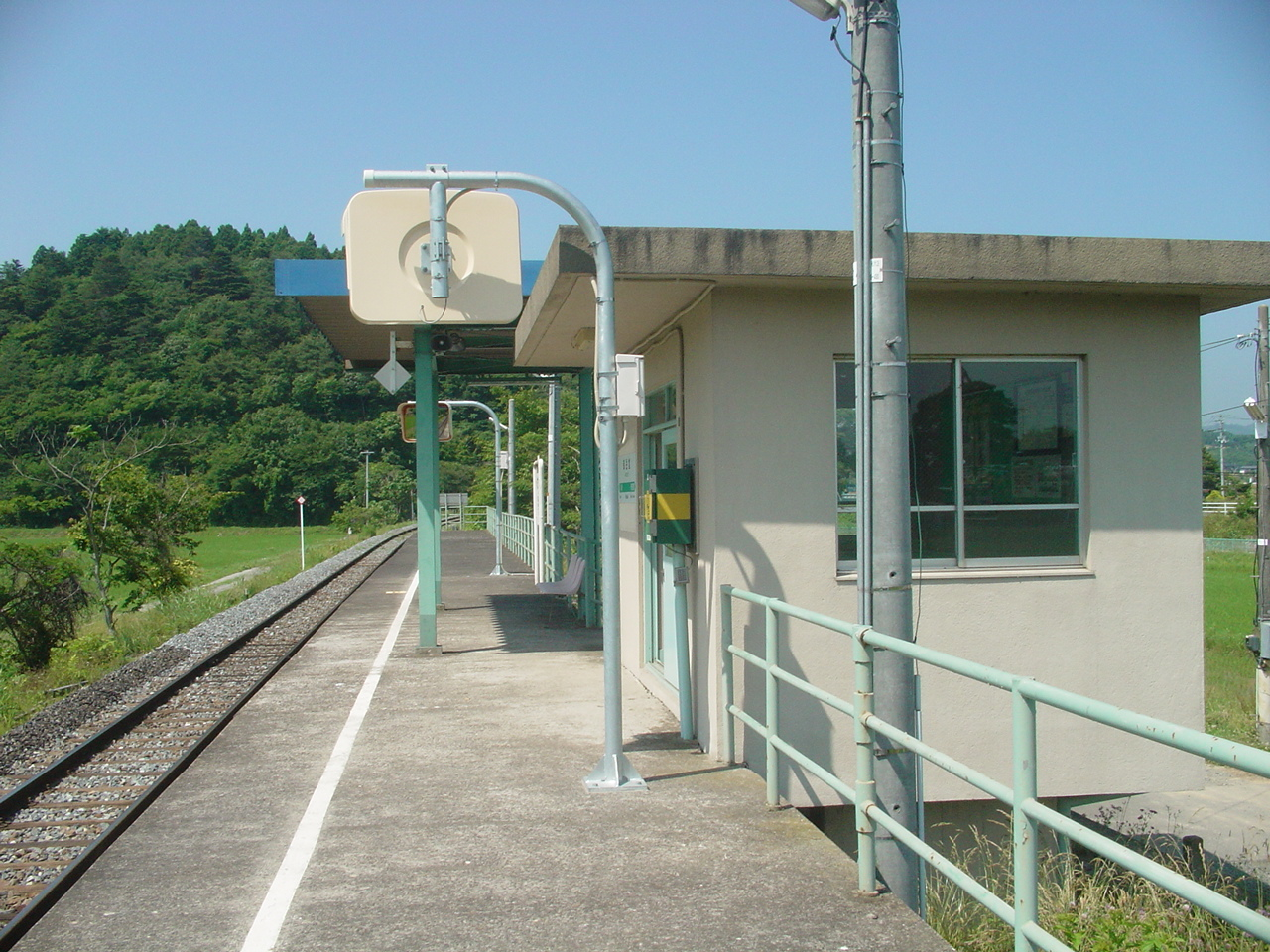
- Mitakedō Station in June 2007

General information
- Location: Toyosato-cho Osawa Numada, Tome-shi, Miyagi-ken 987-0341; Japan
- Coordinates: 38°36′21″N 141°15′53″E
- Operator: JR East
- Line: ■ Kesennuma Line
- Distance: 13.6 km from Maeyachi
- Platforms: 1 side platform
- Tracks: 1

Construction
- Structure type: At grade

Other information
- Status: Unstaffed
- Website: Official website

History
- Opened: October 24, 1968

Services
Preceding station	JR East	Following station
Rikuzen-Toyosato towards Kogota	Kesennuma Line	Yanaizu Terminus
Location
- Location within Miyagi Prefecture Location within Japan

Mitakedō Station (御岳堂駅, Mitakedō-eki) is a railway station located in the city of Tome, Miyagi Prefecture, Japan operated by the East Japan Railway Company (JR East).

== Lines ==
Mitakedō Station is served by the Kesennuma Line, and is located 13.6 rail kilometers from the terminus of the line at Maeyachi Station.

== Station layout ==
The station has one side platform serving a single bi-directional track. The station is unattended.

== History ==
Mitakedō Station opened on October 24, 1968. The station was absorbed into the JR East network upon the privatization of the Japan National Railways (JNR) on April 1, 1987.

== Surrounding area ==
- Kyūkitakami River (Old Kitakami River)

== See also ==
- List of railway stations in Japan
