= Minami-Kesennuma Station =

Former railway station in Kesennuma, Miyagi Prefecture, Japan

Minami-Kesennuma 南気仙沼
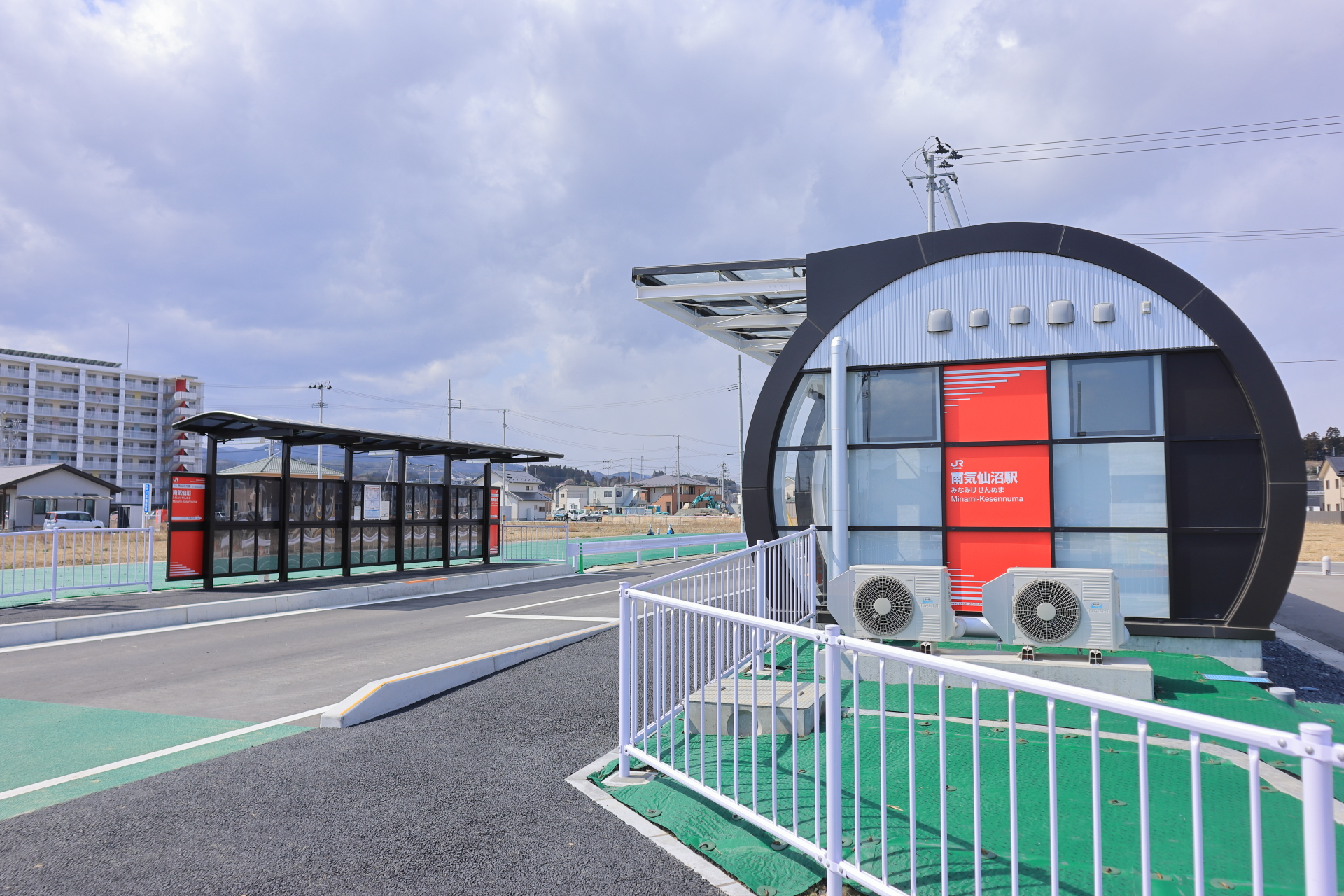
- Minami-Kesennuma BRT bus stop in March 2022

General information
- Location: Nakamachi 2-6-1, Kesennuma, Miyagi （宮城県気仙沼市仲町二丁目6-1） Japan
- Coordinates: 38°53′41″N 141°34′37″E
- Operator: JR East
- Line: ■ Kesennuma Line
- Platforms: 1 island platform

History
- Opened: 11 February 1957.
- Closed: 11 March 2011

Services
Preceding station	JR East	Following station
Kesennuma City Hospital towards Maeyachi	Kesennuma / Ōfunato BRT	Fudōnosawa towards Sakari
Akaiwaminato towards Maeyachi	Kesennuma / Ōfunato BRT	Fudōnosawa towards Sakari

Former services
Preceding station	JR East	Following station
Matsuiwa towards Kogota	Kesennuma Line	Fudōnosawa towards Kesennuma
Location
- Location within Japan

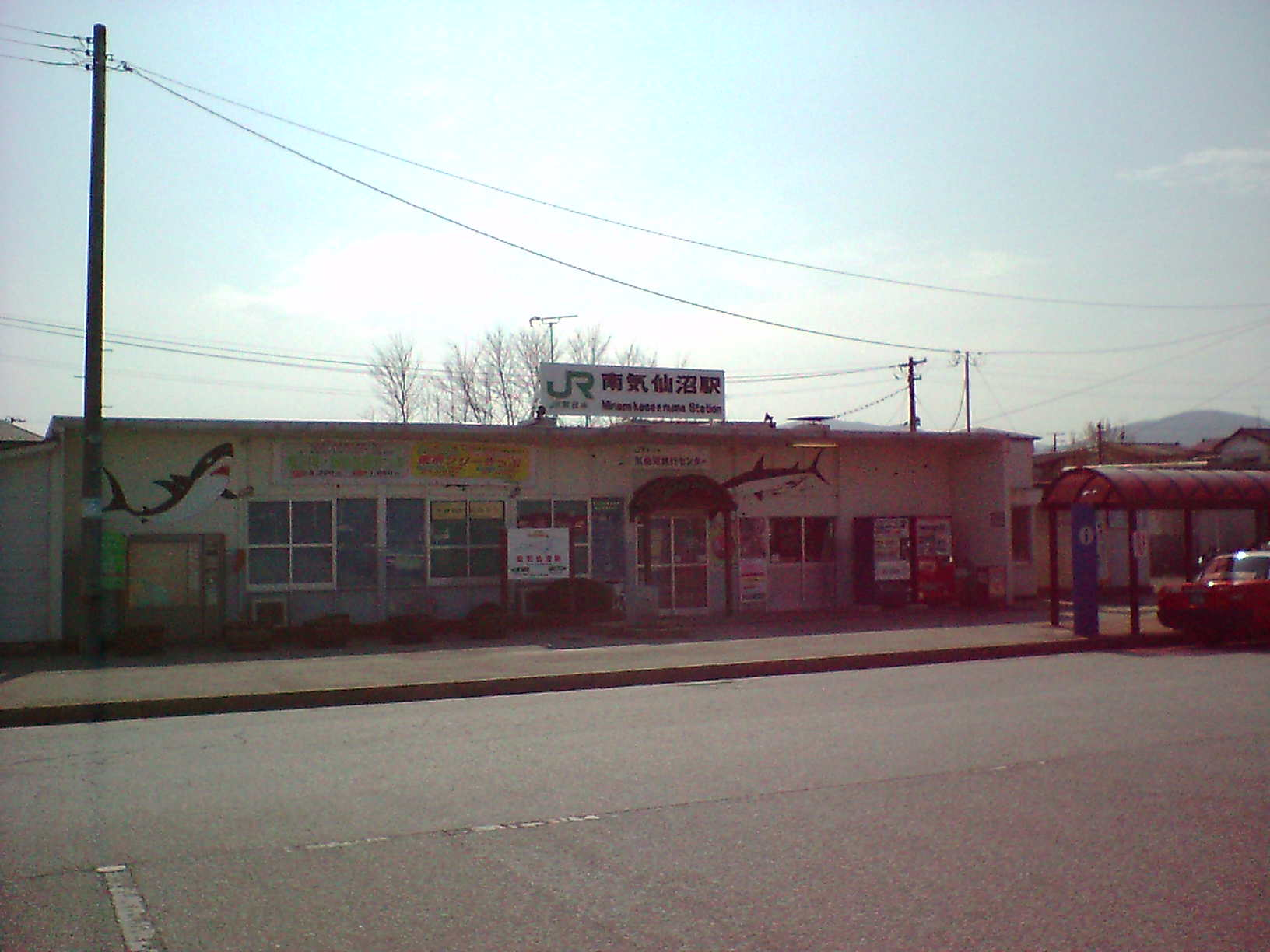
Minami-Kesennuma Station in April 2005

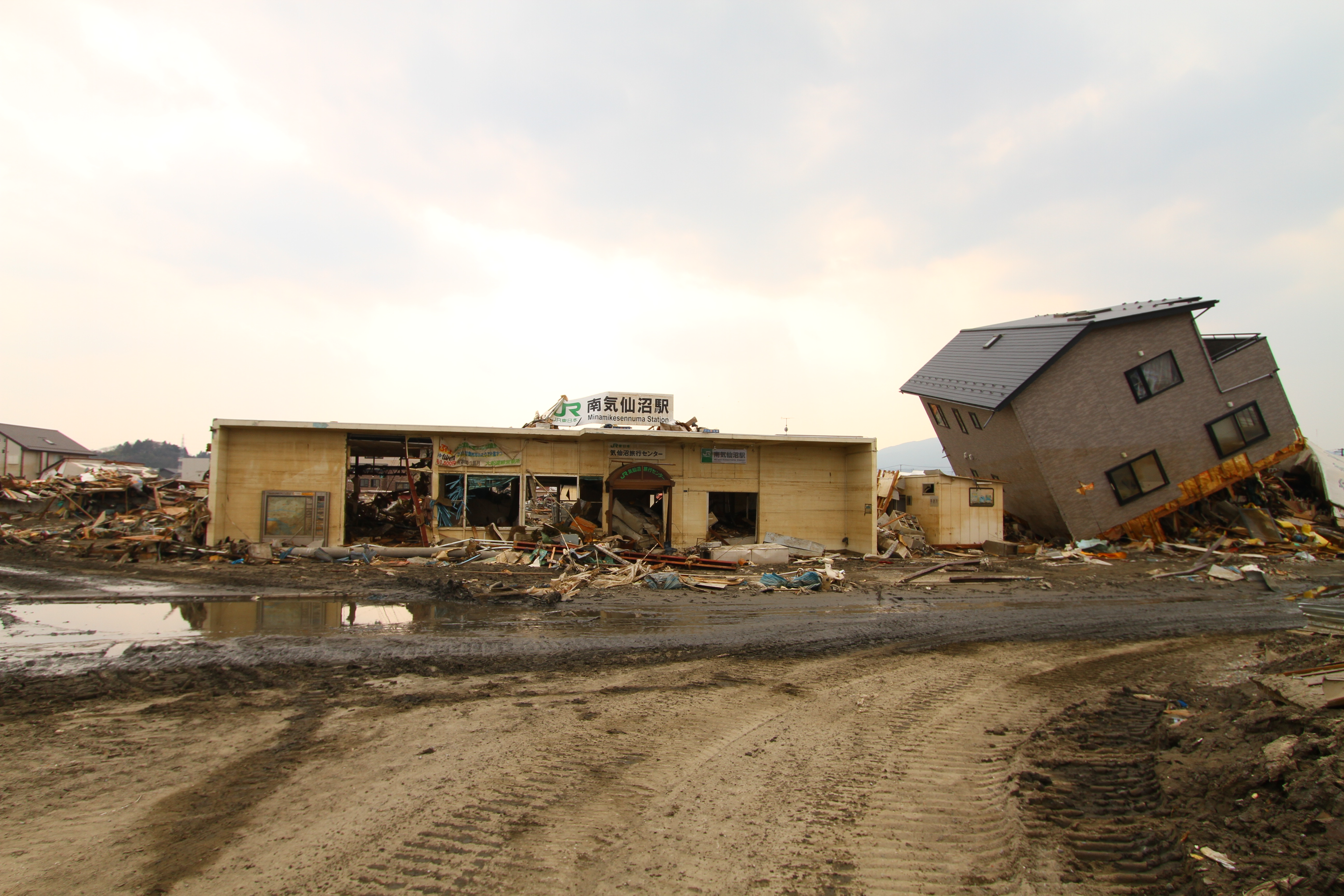
Minami-Kesennuma after the 2011 earthquake

Minami-Kesennuma Station (南気仙沼駅, Minami-Kesennuma-eki) was a JR East railway station located in the city of Kesennuma, Miyagi Prefecture, Japan. It was destroyed by the 2011 Tōhoku earthquake and tsunami and services have now been replaced by a provisional bus rapid transit line.

== Lines ==
Minami-Kesennuma Station was served by the Kesennuma Line, and was located 68.3 rail kilometers from the terminus of the line at Maeyachi Station.

== Station layout ==
Minami-Kesennuma Station had a single side platform serving traffic in both directions. The station was unattended.

== History ==
Minami-Kesennuma Station opened on 11 February 1957. The station was absorbed into the JR East network upon the privatization of the Japan National Railways (JNR) on April 1, 1987. The station was "swept away" save for its platform by the 2011 Tōhoku earthquake and tsunami; services have now been replaced by a bus rapid transit line.

== Surrounding area ==
- Kesennuma Fish Market
- Kesennuma Port
- Kesennuma Shark Museum
- Kesennuma City Hospital
