= Saichi Station =

Former railway station in Kesennuma, Miyagi Prefecture, Japan

Saichi Station 最知駅
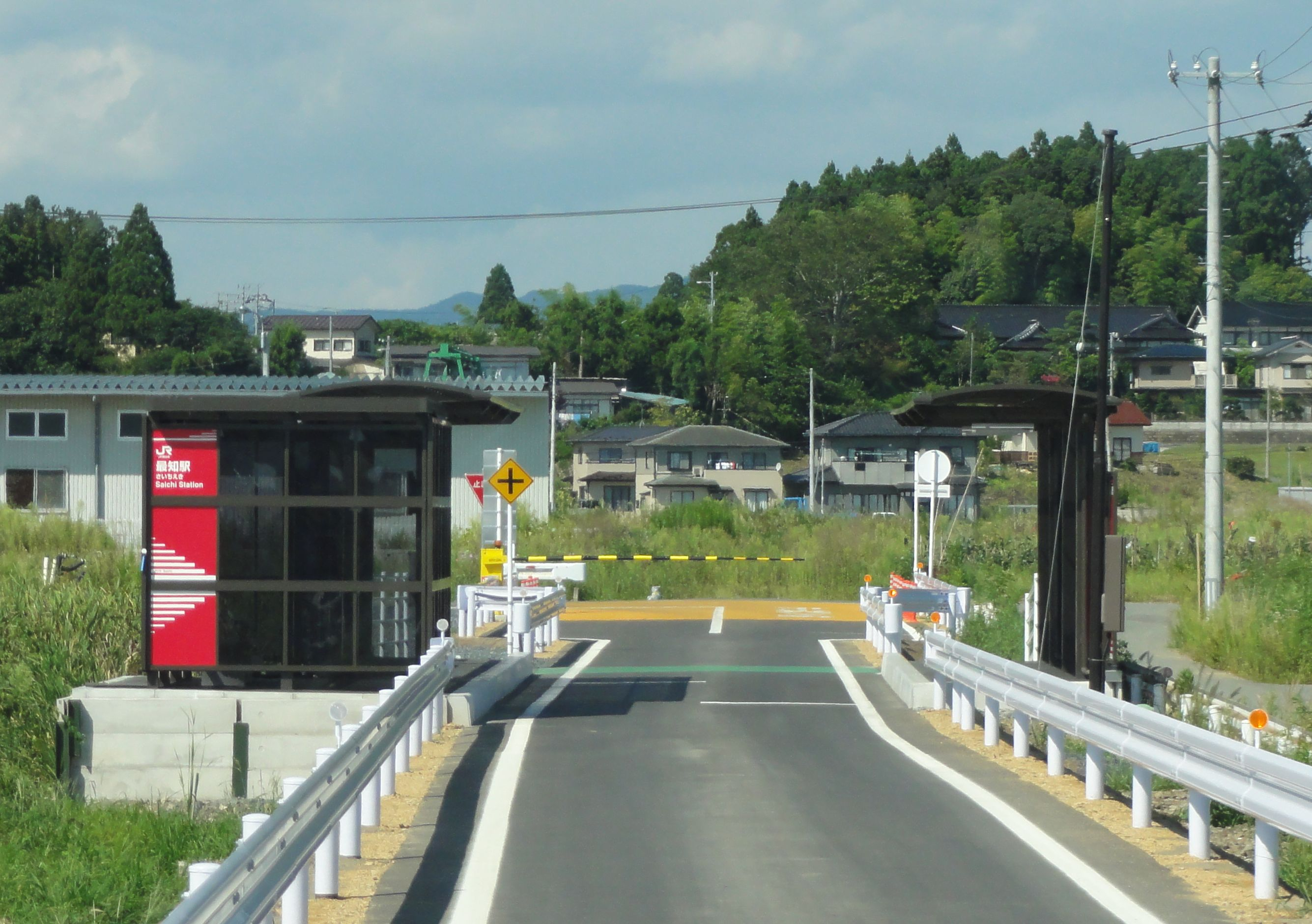
- Saichi BRT Station

General information
- Location: Saichi Kawahara, Kesennuma, Miyagi （宮城県気仙沼市最知川原） Japan
- Coordinates: 38°51′12″N 141°34′53″E
- Operator: JR East
- Line: ■ Kesennuma Line
- Distance: 63.3 km from Maeyachi
- Platforms: 1 side platform

History
- Opened: 20 July 1967
- Closed: 11 March 2011

Services
Preceding station	JR East	Following station
Rikuzen-Hashikami towards Maeyachi	Kesennuma / Ōfunato BRT	Iwatsuki towards Sakari

Former services
Preceding station	JR East	Following station
Rikuzen-Hashikami towards Kogota	Kesennuma Line	Matsuiwa towards Kesennuma
Location
- Location within Japan

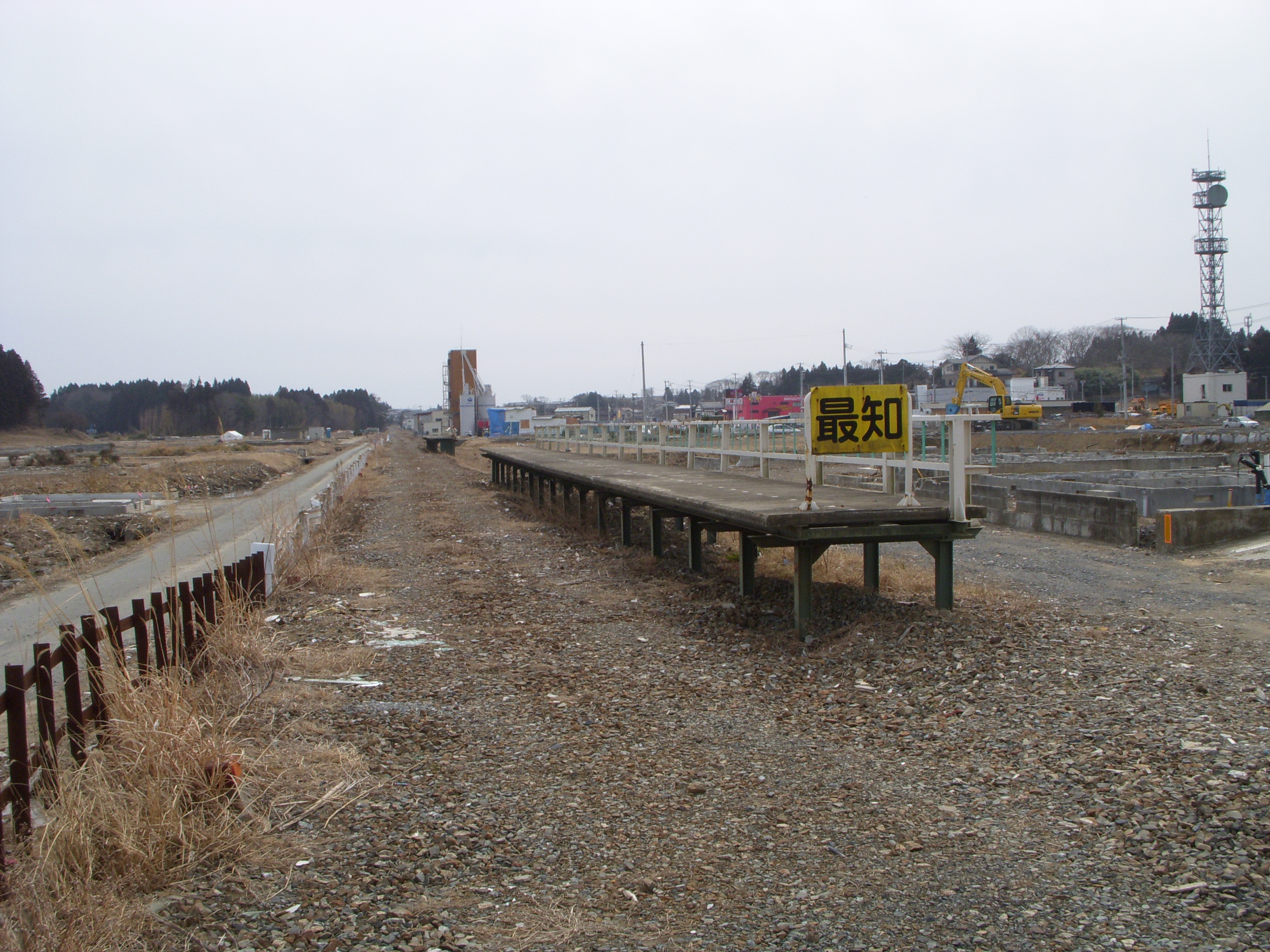
Saichi Station after the 2011 earthquake

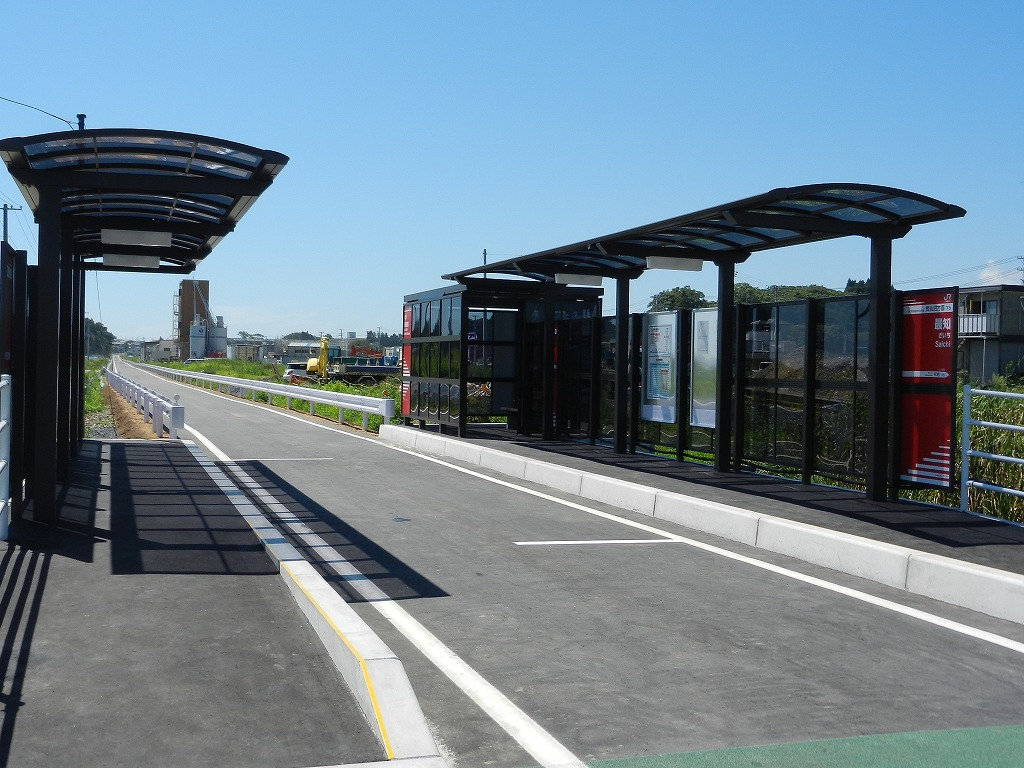
BRT bus stop in August 2012

Saichi Station (最知駅, Saichi-eki) was a JR East railway station located in Kesennuma, Miyagi Prefecture, Japan. It was destroyed by the 2011 Tōhoku earthquake and tsunami and services have now been replaced by a provisional bus rapid transit line.

== Lines ==
Saichi Station was served by the Kesennuma Line, and was located 63.3 rail kilometers from the terminus of the line at Maeyachi Station.

== Station layout ==
Saichi Station had one side platform serving a single bi-directional track. The station was unattended.

== History ==
Saichi Station opened on 20 July 1967. The station was absorbed into the JR East network upon the privatization of the Japan National Railways (JNR) on April 1, 1987. The station was "swept away" save for its platform by the 2011 Tōhoku earthquake and tsunami. Services have now been replaced by a bus rapid transit line.

== Surrounding area ==
- Japan National Route 45
