= Fudōnosawa Station =

Former railway station in Kesennuma, Miyagi Prefecture, Japan

Fudōnosawa Station 不動の沢駅
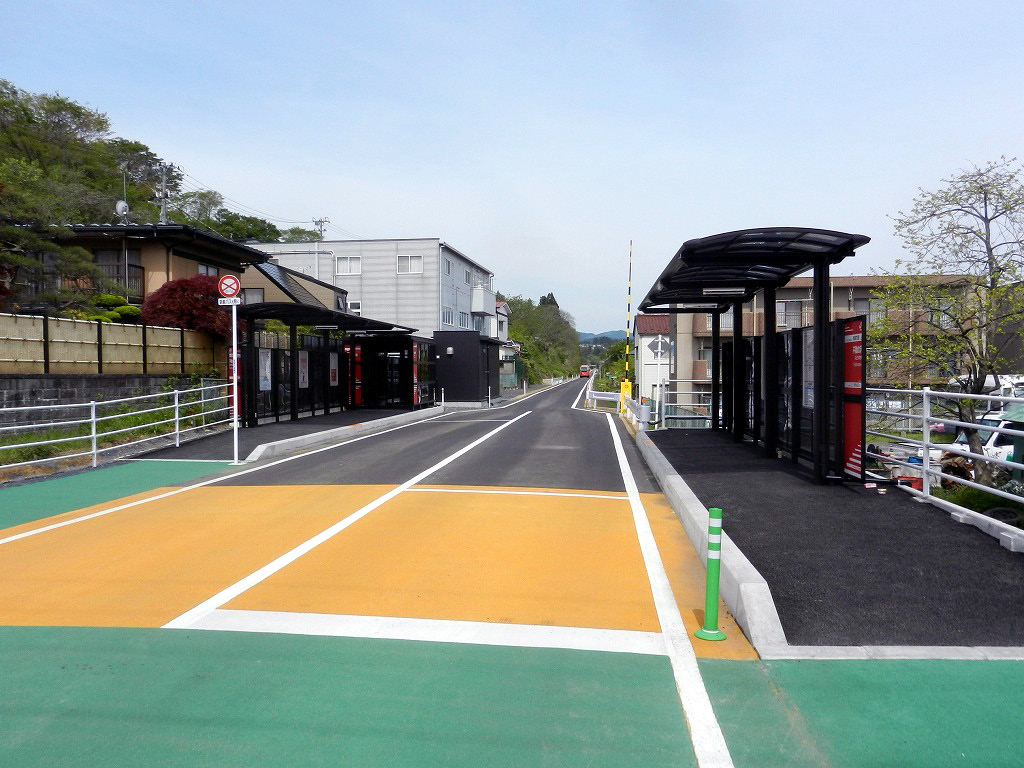
- Fudōnosawa Station in May 2013

General information
- Location: Shitanda, Kesennuma, Miyagi （宮城県気仙沼市四反田） Japan
- Coordinates: 38°53′55″N 141°33′44″E
- Operator: JR East
- Line: ■ Kesennuma Line
- Distance: 69.6 km from Maeyachi
- Platforms: 1 side platform

History
- Opened: 10 October 1960
- Closed: 11 March 2011

Services
Preceding station	JR East	Following station
Minami-Kesennuma towards Maeyachi	Kesennuma / Ōfunato BRT	Higashi Shinjo towards Sakari

Former services
Preceding station	JR East	Following station
Minami-Kesennuma towards Kogota	Kesennuma Line	Kesennuma Terminus
Location
- Location within Japan

Fudōnosawa Station (不動の沢駅, Fudōnosawa-eki) was a JR East railway station located in Kesennuma, Miyagi Prefecture, Japan. Services to the station have been suspended since the 2011 Tōhoku earthquake and tsunami and have now been replaced by a provisional bus rapid transit line.

== Lines ==
Fudōnosawa Station was served by the Kesennuma Line, and is located 69.6 rail kilometers from the terminus of the line at Maeyachi Station.

== Station layout ==
Fudōnosawa Station had one side platform serving a single bi-directional track. The station was unattended.

== History ==
Fudōnosawa Station opened on 10 October 1960. The station was absorbed into the JR East network upon the privatization of the Japan National Railways (JNR) on April 1, 1987. Services to the station have been suspended since the 2011 Tōhoku earthquake and tsunami and have now been replaced by a provisional bus rapid transit line, and the former platform and station building modified into a bus station.

== Surrounding area ==
- Kesennuma General Hospital
- Japan National Route 45
