= Rikuzen-Hashikami Station =

Former railway station in Kesennuma, Miyagi Prefecture, Japan

Rikuzen-Hashikami Station 陸前階上駅
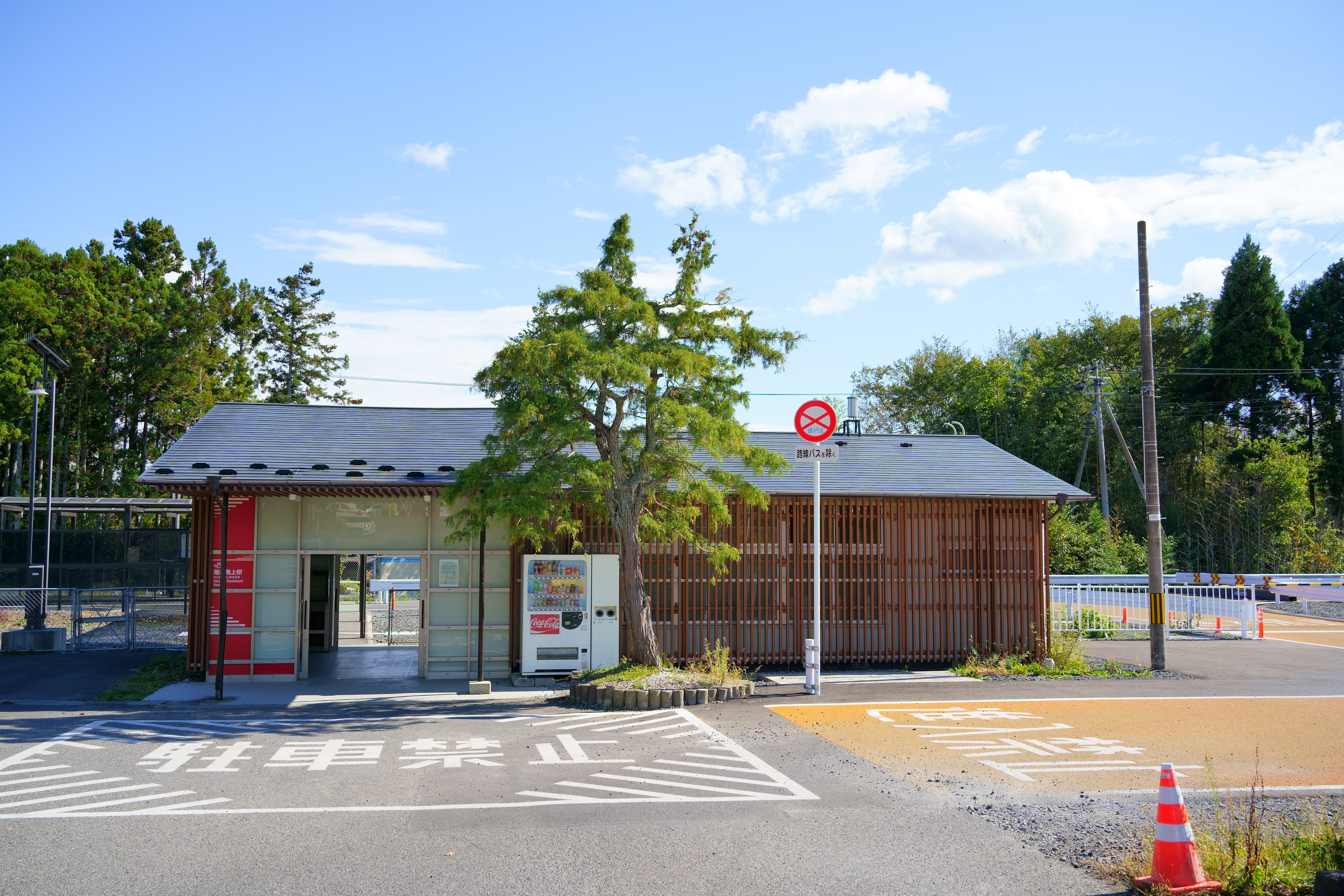
- Rikuzen-Hashikami BRT Station

General information
- Location: Nagaisohara, Kesennuma, Miyagi （宮城県気仙沼市長磯原） Japan
- Coordinates: 38°50′14″N 141°34′49″E
- Operator: JR East
- Line: ■ Kesennuma Line
- Distance: 61.6 km from Maeyachi
- Platforms: 1 island platform

History
- Opened: 11 February 1957
- Closed: 11 March 2011

Services
Preceding station	JR East	Following station
Oyamachi towards Maeyachi	Kesennuma / Ōfunato BRT	Saichi towards Sakari

Former services
Preceding station	JR East	Following station
Ōyakaigan towards Kogota	Kesennuma Line	Saichi towards Kesennuma
Location
- Location within Japan

Rikuzen-Hashikami Station (陸前階上駅, Rikuzen-Hashikami-eki) was a JR East railway station located in the city of Kesennuma, Miyagi Prefecture, Japan. The station was damaged by the 2011 Tōhoku earthquake and tsunami; however services have now been replaced by a provisional bus rapid transit line.

== Lines ==
Rikuzen-Hashikami Station was served by the Kesennuma Line, and was located 61.6 rail kilometers from the terminus of the line at Maeyachi Station.

== Station layout ==
Rikuzen-Hashikami Station had a single island platform connected to the station building by an overhead crossing. The station was unattended.

== History ==
Rikuzen-Hashikami Station opened on 11 February 1957. The station was absorbed into the JR East network upon the privatization of the Japan National Railways (JNR) on April 1, 1987. Rail services were suspended after the 2011 Tōhoku earthquake and tsunami and have now been replaced by a bus rapid transit line.

== Surrounding area ==
- Japan National Route 45
- Iwai Peninsula
- Ise Beach Ocean Bathing Area
