= Wabuchi Station =

Railway station in Ishinomaki, Miyagi Prefecture, Japan

Wabuchi Station 和渕駅
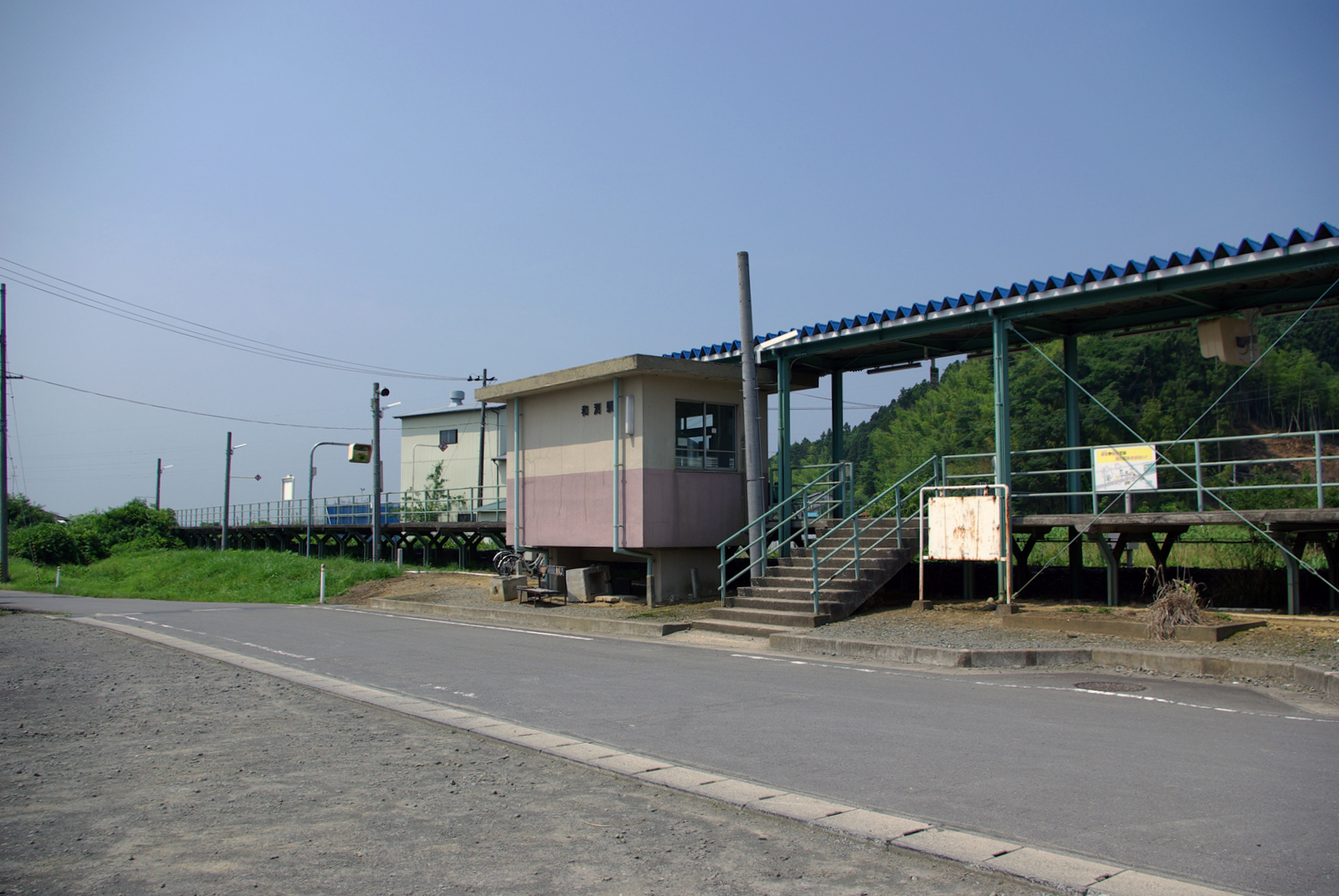
- Wabuchi Station in July 2009

General information
- Location: Wabuchi-aze Shimizu 123, Ishinomaki-shi, Miyagi-ken 987-1102; Japan
- Coordinates: 38°31′33″N 141°13′14″E
- Operator: JR East
- Line: ■ Kesennuma Line
- Distance: 3.2 km from Maeyachi
- Platforms: 1 side platform
- Tracks: 1

Construction
- Structure type: At grade

Other information
- Status: Unstaffed
- Website: Official website

History
- Opened: 24 October 1968

Services
Preceding station	JR East	Following station
Maeyachi towards Kogota	Kesennuma Line	Nonodake towards Yanaizu
Location
- Location within Miyagi Prefecture Location within Japan

Wabuchi Station (和渕駅, Wabuchi-eki) is a railway station in the city of Ishinomaki, Miyagi Prefecture, Japan, operated by East Japan Railway Company (JR East).

== Lines ==
Wabuchi Station is served by the Kesennuma Line, and is located 3.2 kilometers from the terminus of the line at Maeyachi Station.

== Station layout ==
The station has one side platform serving a single bi-directional line. The station is unattended.

== History ==
Wabuchi Station opened on 24 October 1968. The station was absorbed into the JR East network upon the privatization of the Japanese National Railways (JNR) on 1 April 1987.

== Surrounding area ==
- Miyagi Prefectural Road 21
- Wabuchi Post Office

== See also ==
- List of railway stations in Japan
