= Matsuiwa Station =

Former railway station in Kesennuma, Miyagi Prefecture, Japan

Matsuiwa Station 松岩駅
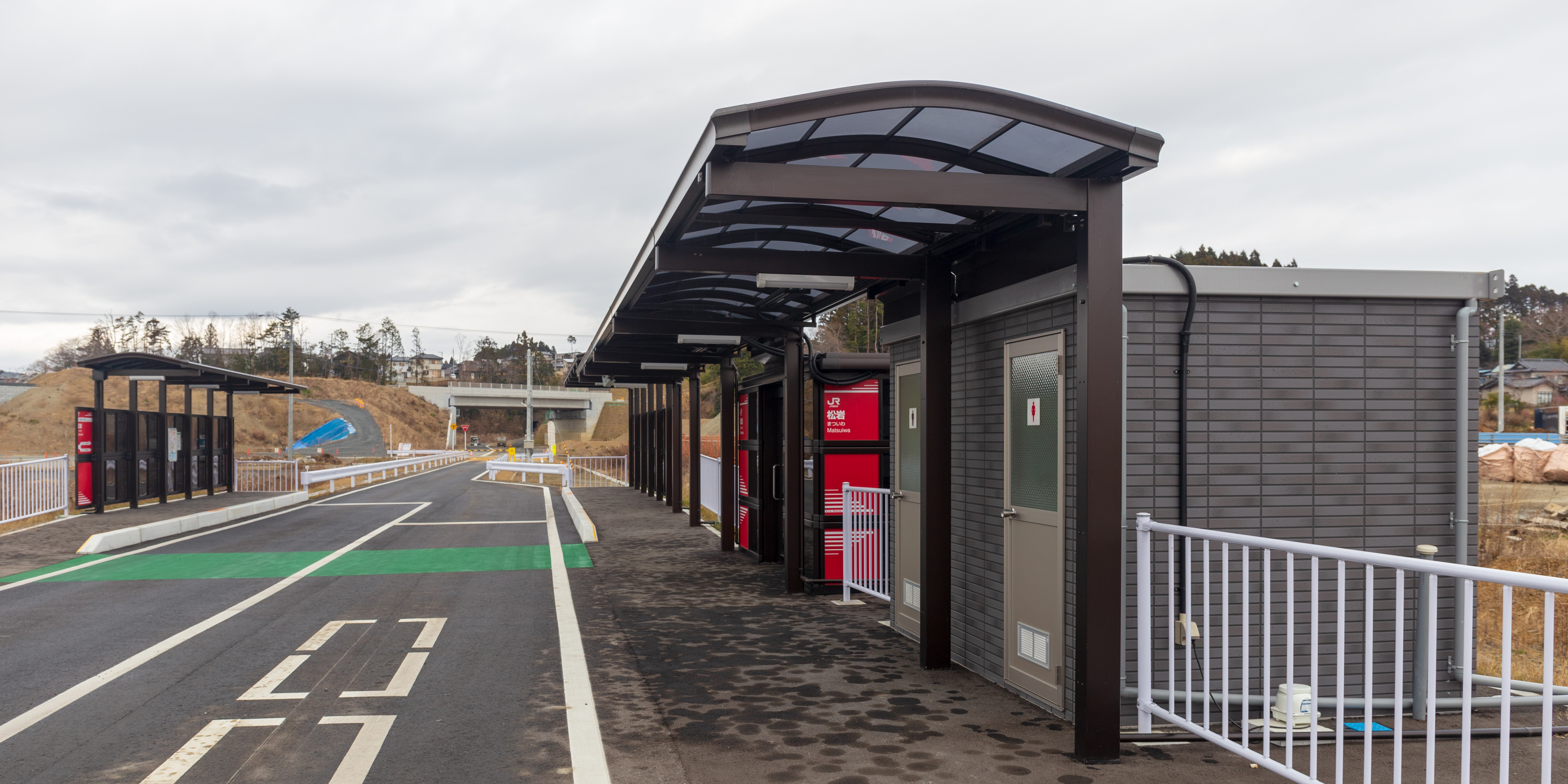
- Matsuiwa Station in 2018

General information
- Location: Matsuzaka Katahama 10, Kesennuma, Miyagi （宮城県気仙沼市松崎片浜10） Japan
- Coordinates: 38°52′24″N 141°35′02″E
- Operator: JR East
- Line: ■ Kesennuma Line
- Distance: 65.6 km from Maeyachi
- Platforms: 1 side platform

History
- Opened: 11 February 1957
- Closed: 11 March 2011

Services
Preceding station	JR East	Following station
Iwazuki towards Maeyachi	Kesennuma / Ōfunato BRT	Kesennuma City Hospital towards Sakari
Iwazuki towards Maeyachi	Kesennuma / Ōfunato BRT	Akaiwaminato towards Sakari

Former services
Preceding station	JR East	Following station
Saichi towards Kogota	Kesennuma Line	Minami-Kesennuma towards Kesennuma
Location
- Location within Japan

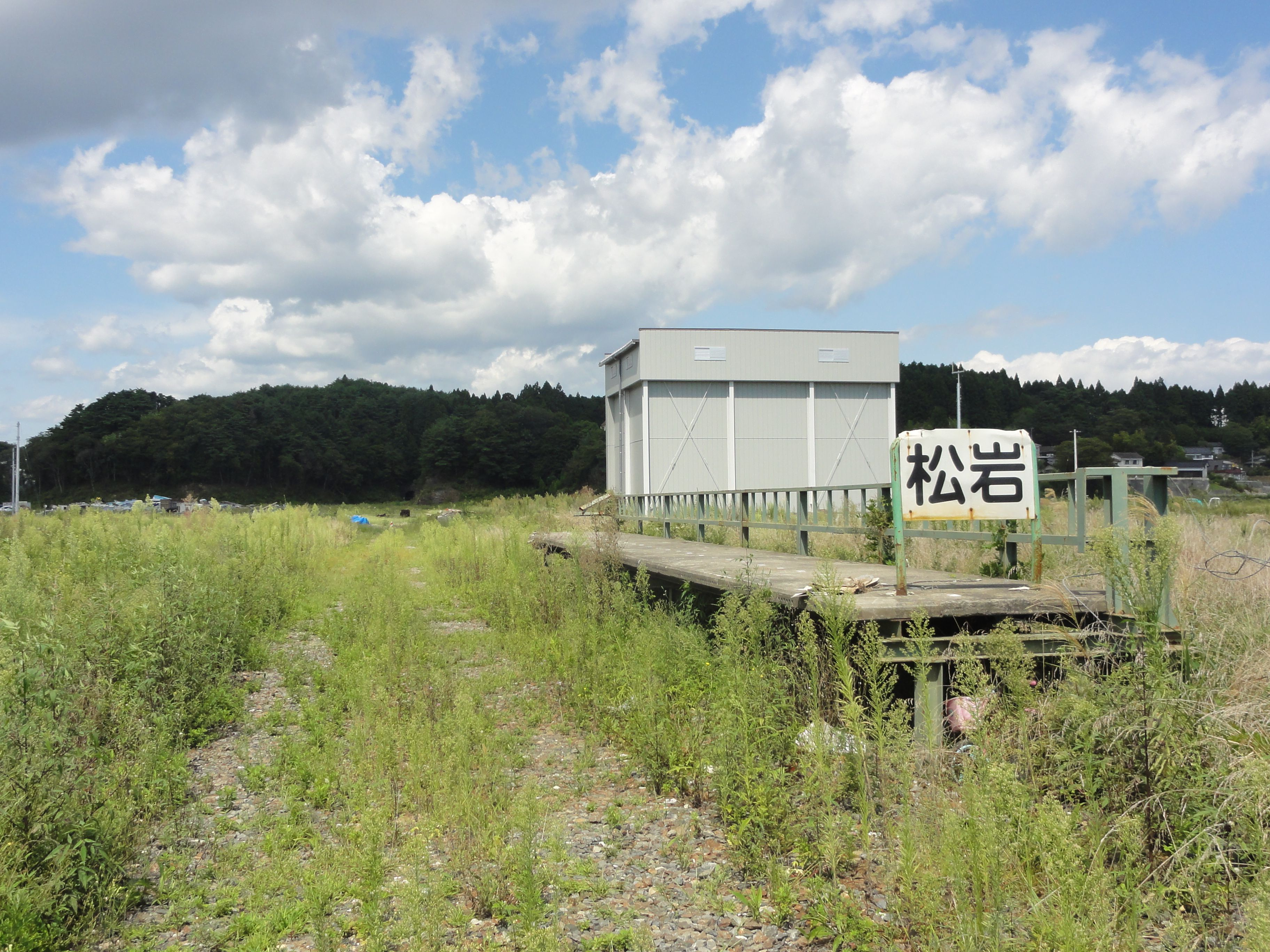
Matsuiwa Station after the 2011 earthquake

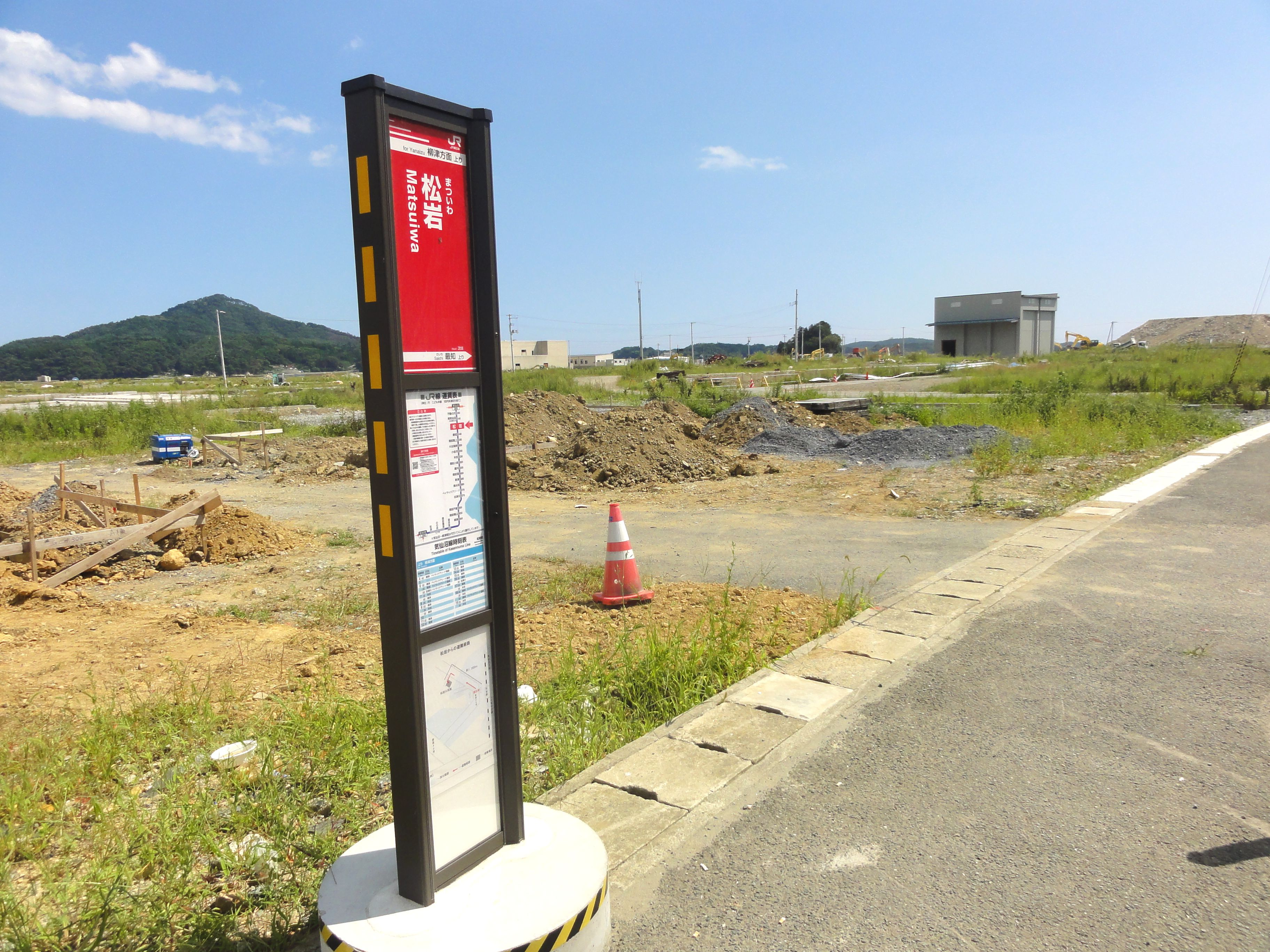
BRT bus stop in August 2012

Matsuiwa Station (松岩駅, Matsuiwa-eki) was a JR East railway station located in the city of Kesennuma, Miyagi Prefecture, Japan. It was destroyed by the 2011 Tōhoku earthquake and tsunami and services have now been replaced by a provisional bus rapid transit line.

== Lines ==
Matsuiwa Station was served by the Kesennuma Line, and is located 65.6 rail kilometers from the terminus of the line at Maeyachi Station.

== Station layout ==
Matsuiwa Station had one side platform serving a single bi-directional track. The station was unattended.

== History ==
Matsuiwa Station opened on 11 February 1957. The station was absorbed into the JR East network upon the privatization of the Japan National Railways (JNR) on April 1, 1987. The station was "swept away" save for its platform by the 2011 Tōhoku earthquake and tsunami. Services have now been replaced by a bus rapid transit line.

== Surrounding area ==
- Shoganji Shrine
- Matsuiwa Port Passenger Ferry Terminal
- Japan National Route 45
