= Rikuzen-Yokoyama Station =

Former railway station in Tome, Miyagi Prefecture, Japan

Rikuzen-Yokoyama Station 陸前横山
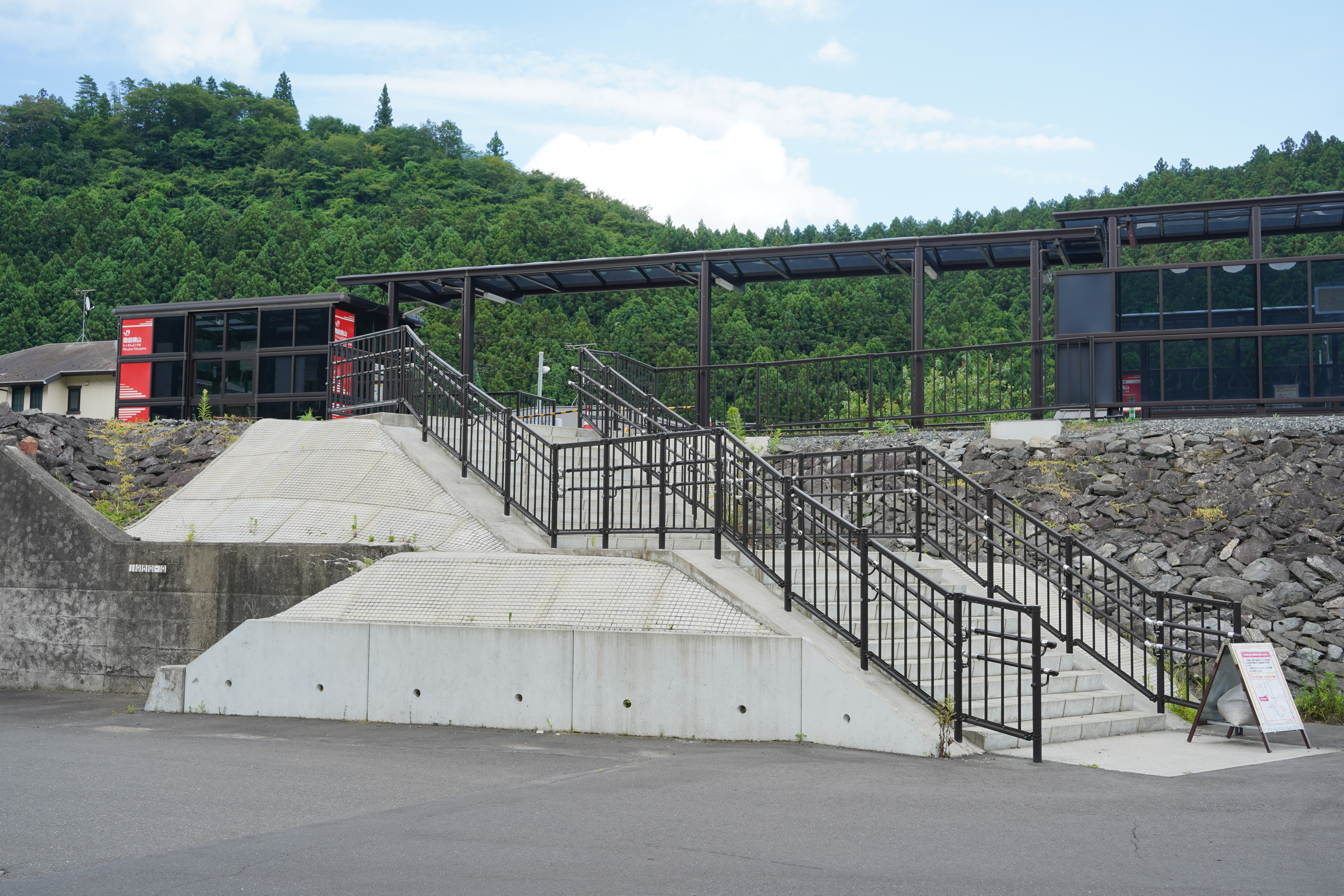
- Rikuzen-Yokoyama Station in July 2021

General information
- Location: Tsuyama-cho Yokoyama Honcho 152, Tome, Miyagi （宮城県登米市津山町横山字本町152） Japan
- Coordinates: 38°37′51″N 141°21′14″E
- Operator: JR East
- Line: ■ Kesennuma Line
- Distance: 22.3 km from Maeyachi
- Platforms: 1 side platform
- Tracks: 1

Construction
- Structure type: At grade

Other information
- Status: unstaffed
- Website: Official website

History
- Opened: December 11, 1977
- Closed: March 11, 2011

Services
Preceding station	JR East	Following station
Yanaizu towards Maeyachi	Kesennuma / Ōfunato BRT	Rikuzen-Togura towards Sakari
Location
- Location within Japan

Rikuzen-Yokoyama Station (陸前横山駅, Rikuzen-Yokoyama-eki) is a JR East railway station located in the city of Tome, Miyagi Prefecture, Japan. The station was undamaged by the 2011 tsunami; however services have now been replaced by a bus rapid transit line.

== Lines ==
Rikuzen-Yokoyama Station is served by the Kesennuma Line, and is located 22.3 rail kilometers from the terminus of the line at Maeyachi Station.

== Station layout ==
Rikuzen-Yokoyama Station had one side platform serving a single-bi-directional track. The station was unattended. This has been changed to a ground-level platform serving bus rapid transit service.

== History ==
Rikuzen-Yokoyama Station opened on December 11, 1977. The station was absorbed into the JR East network upon the privatization of the Japan National Railways (JNR) on April 1, 1987. Operations were discontinued after the 2011 Tōhoku earthquake and tsunami. In 2018 the replacement bus rapid transit service was restored to a roadway on the former tracks.

== Surrounding area ==
- Japan National Route 45
- Yokoyama Post Office

== See also ==
- List of railway stations in Japan
