= Kesennuma Line =

Railway line in Miyagi Prefecture, Japan

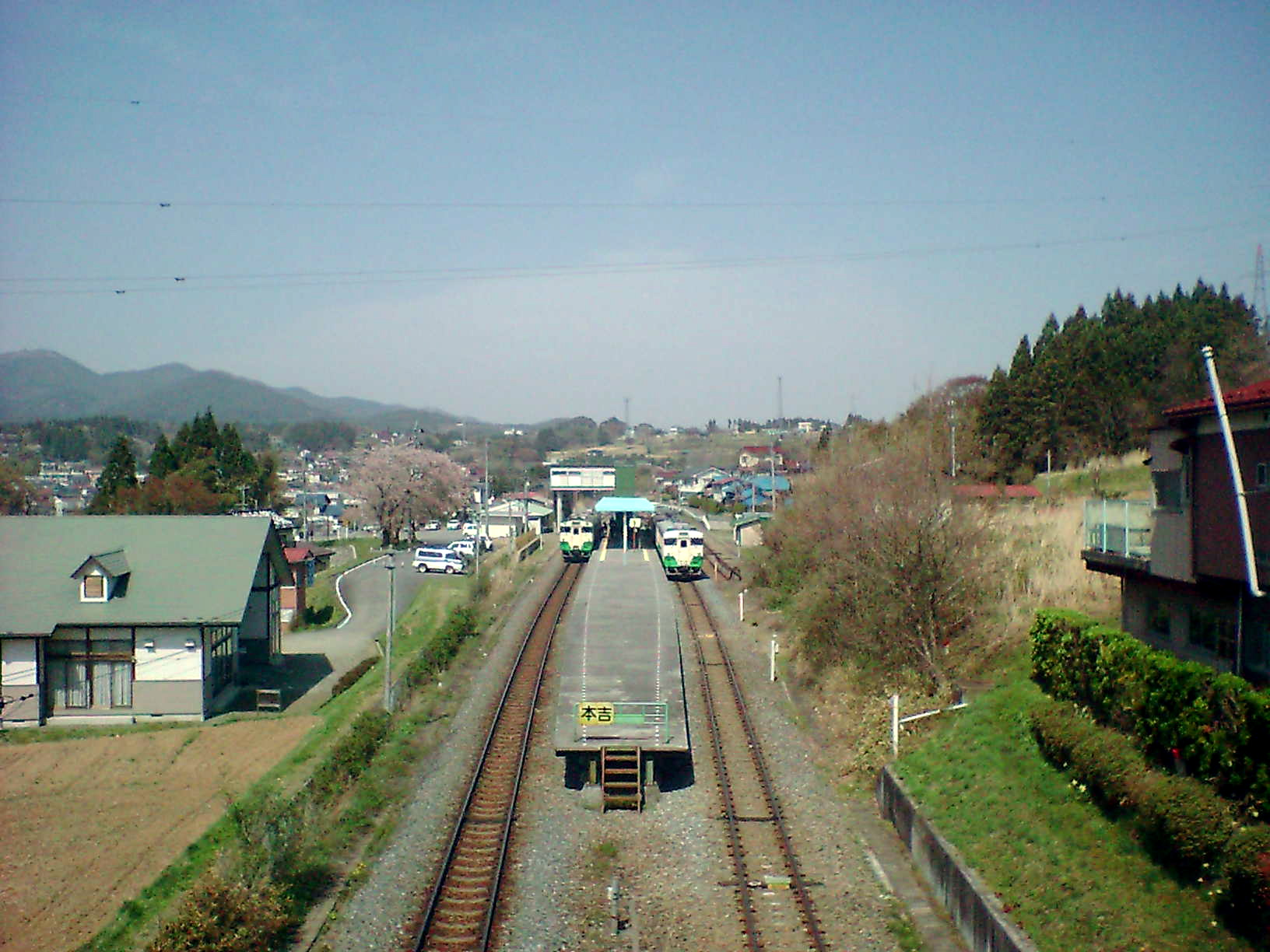
- North and southbound trains at Motoyoshi Station, April 2005

Overview
- Native name: 気仙沼線
- Status: In operation (Maeyachi - Yanaizu as a railway) (Yanaizu - Kesennuma as a BRT route)
- Owner: JR East
- Locale: Miyagi Prefecture
- Termini: Maeyachi Station; Kesennuma Station
- Stations: 23 (Only 6 are railway stations following the 2011 disaster)

Service
- Operator: JR East
- Rolling stock: KiHa 110 series DMU, Hino Blue Ribbon City Bus

History
- Opened: 11 February 1957
- Closed: 1 April 2020 (Section between Yanaizu - Kesennuma was replaced by bus rapid transit in December 2012 but was only formally closed in 2020)

Technical
- Line length: 72.8 km (45.2 mi) (Until 2011); 17.5 km (10.9 mi) (After 2011)
- Number of tracks: Entire line single tracked
- Character: Mainly rural with some more urban areas
- Track gauge: 1,067 mm (3 ft 6 in)
- Electrification: None
- Operating speed: 85 km/h (53 mph)
Route map

The Kesennuma Line (気仙沼線, Kesennuma-sen) is a local railway and bus rapid transit line in Japan, operated by the East Japan Railway Company (JR East). It connects Maeyachi Station in the city of Ishinomaki, Miyagi to Kesennuma Station in the city of Kesennuma, Miyagi. The route links the northeastern coast of Miyagi Prefecture with the Ishinomaki Line (and the Tohoku Main Line a few stops farther) available for transfer in the south, and the Ōfunato Line in the north.

Originally a railway from end to end, the line was severely damaged by the 2011 Tōhoku earthquake and tsunami, with tracks, stations, and railway bridges between Minami-Kesennuma Station and Rikuzen-Togura Station sustaining major damage. Destroyed stations included Minami-Kesennuma (except for the platform) and Shizugawa Station, as well as various others. As a result of the catastrophic damage to the line and prohibitive costs of restoration as a railway, JR East officially proposed the line's conversion into a dedicated bus rapid transit route on 27 December 2011. At present only the Maeyachi to Yanaizu section is operated as a railway, with services on the remainder of the route provided by buses. The buses have been Level 2 self-driving since December 2022.

== Service ==
Although the Kesennuma Line's south end is Maeyachi, its operational south end should be considered Kogota Station in Misato, as the majority of Kesennuma Line trains either have Kogota as their south terminus or go through it on the way to Sendai. Trains going this far also stop at Kami-Wakuya (local only) and Wakuya Stations in Wakuya, Miyagi on the Ishinomaki Line.

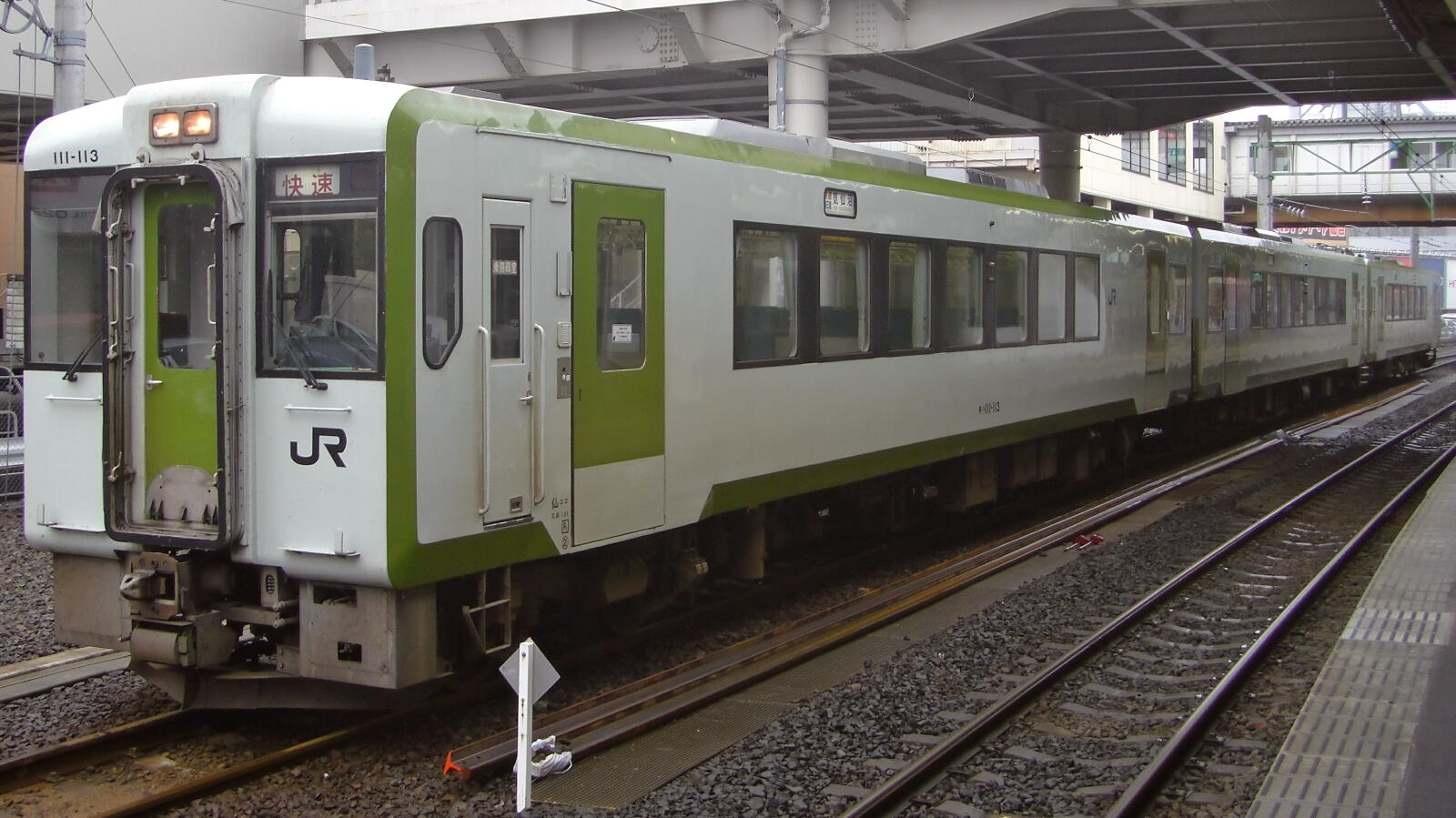
KiHa 110 series diesel multiple unit

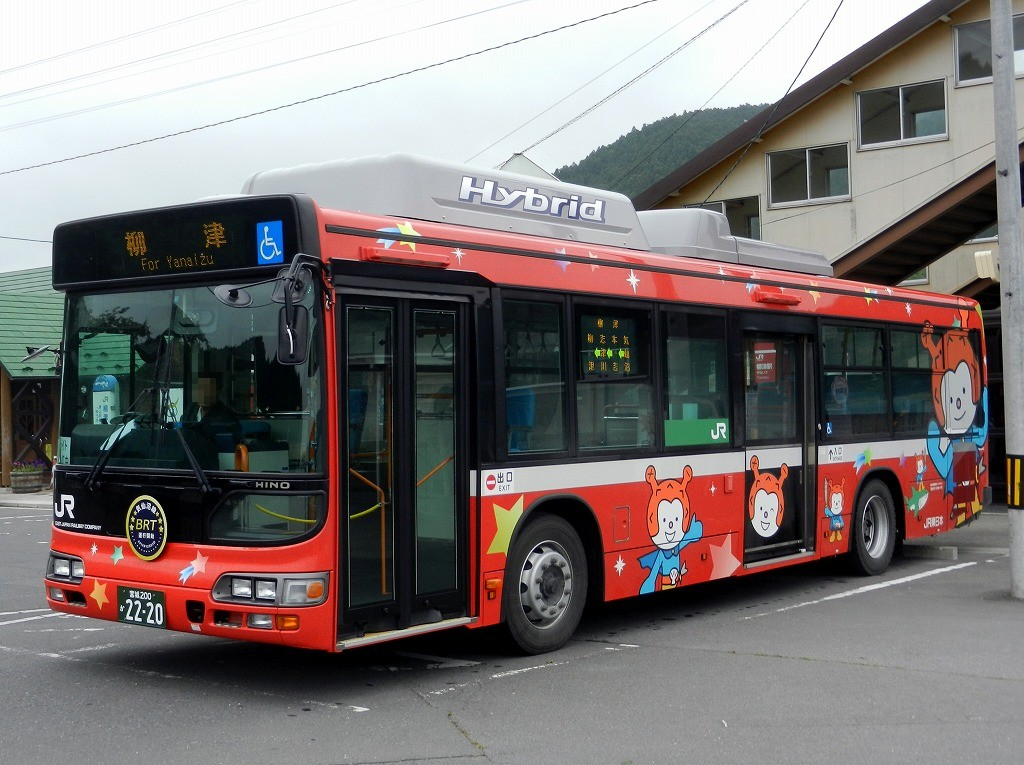
Hino Blue Ribbon City bus used on the Kesennuma BRT

== Station list ==
Greyed-out stations have been closed since the 2011 Tōhoku earthquake and tsunami, and operate only as bus stops for the JR East BRT route.

Station name	Japanese	Distance from previous station	Distance from Maeyachi	Local train	BRT	Transfers	Location
Maeyachi	前谷地	-	0.0	●	●	■ Ishinomaki Line	Ishinomaki, Miyagi
Wabuchi	和渕	3.2	3.2	●	|		Ishinomaki, Miyagi
Nonodake	のの岳	3.0	6.2	●	|		Wakuya, Miyagi
Rikuzen-Toyosato	陸前豊里	4.1	10.3	●	|		Tome, Miyagi
Mitakedō	御岳堂	3.3	13.6	●	|		Tome, Miyagi
Yanaizu	柳津	3.9	17.5	●	●		Tome, Miyagi
Rikuzen-Yokoyama	陸前横山	4.8	22.3	No rail service	●		Tome, Miyagi
Rikuzen-Togura	陸前戸倉	7.2	29.5	No rail service	●		Minamisanriku, Miyagi
Shizugawa	志津川	4.2	33.7	No rail service	●		Minamisanriku, Miyagi
Shizuhama	清水浜	4.5	38.2	No rail service	●		Minamisanriku, Miyagi
Utatsu	歌津	4.1	42.3	No rail service	●		Minamisanriku, Miyagi
Rikuzen-Minato	陸前港	2.6	44.9	No rail service	●		Minamisanriku, Miyagi
Kurauchi	蔵内	1.8	46.7	No rail service	●		Kesennuma, Miyagi
Rikuzen-Koizumi	陸前小泉	2.0	48.7	No rail service	●		Kesennuma, Miyagi
Motoyoshi	本吉	2.8	51.5	No rail service	●		Kesennuma, Miyagi
Koganezawa	小金沢	3.1	54.6	No rail service	●		Kesennuma, Miyagi
Ōyakaigan	大谷海岸	3.7	58.3	No rail service	●		Kesennuma, Miyagi
Rikuzen-Hashikami	陸前階上	3.3	61.6	No rail service	●		Kesennuma, Miyagi
Saichi	最知	1.7	63.3	No rail service	●		Kesennuma, Miyagi
Matsuiwa	松岩	2.3	65.6	No rail service	●		Kesennuma, Miyagi
Minami-Kesennuma	南気仙沼	2.7	68.3	No rail service	●		Kesennuma, Miyagi
Fudōnosawa	不動の沢	1.3	69.6	No rail service	●		Kesennuma, Miyagi
Kesennuma	気仙沼	3.2	72.8	No rail service	●	■ Ōfunato Line	Kesennuma, Miyagi

== History ==
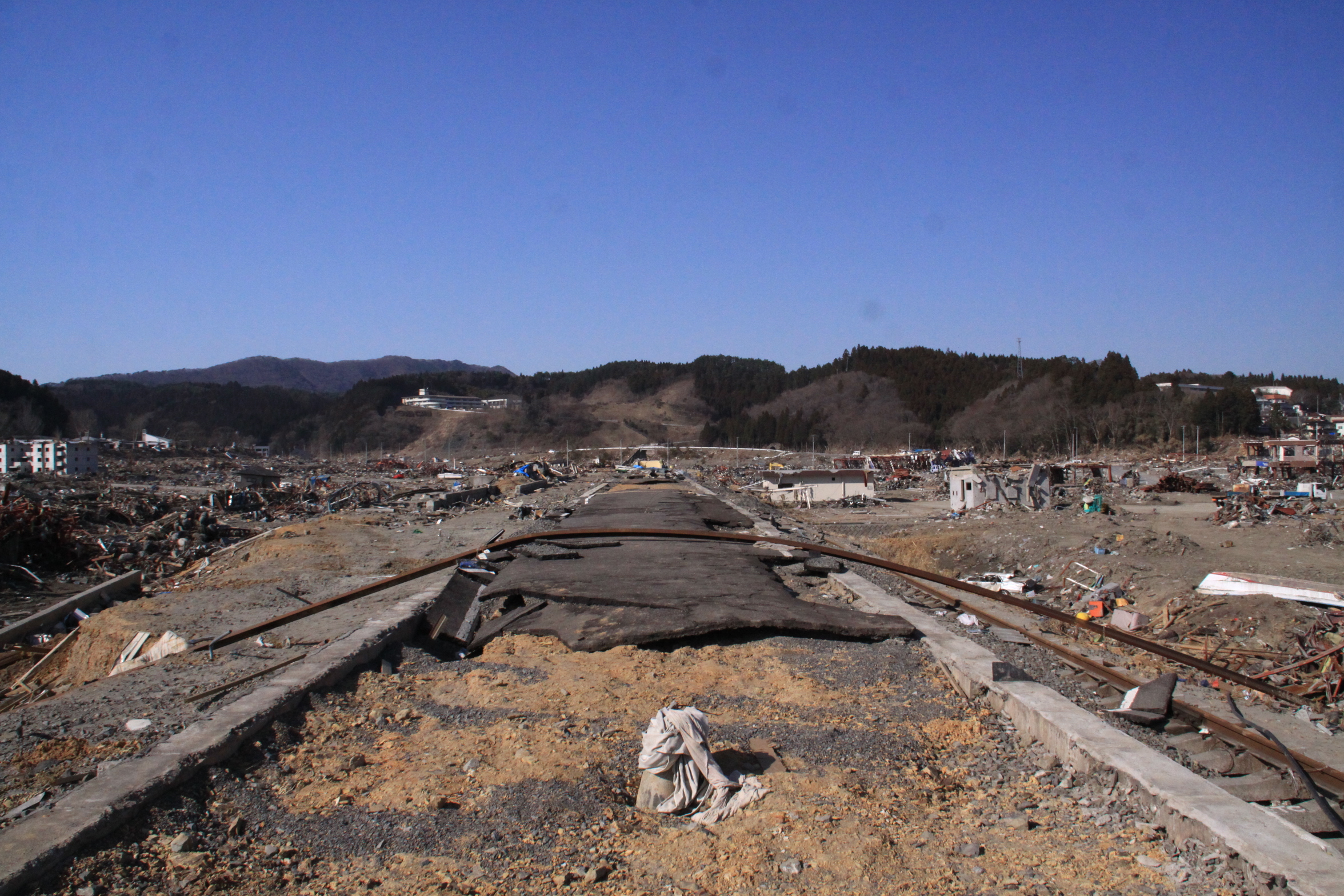
Remains of Kesennuma Line near Shizugawa Station following 2011 tsunami

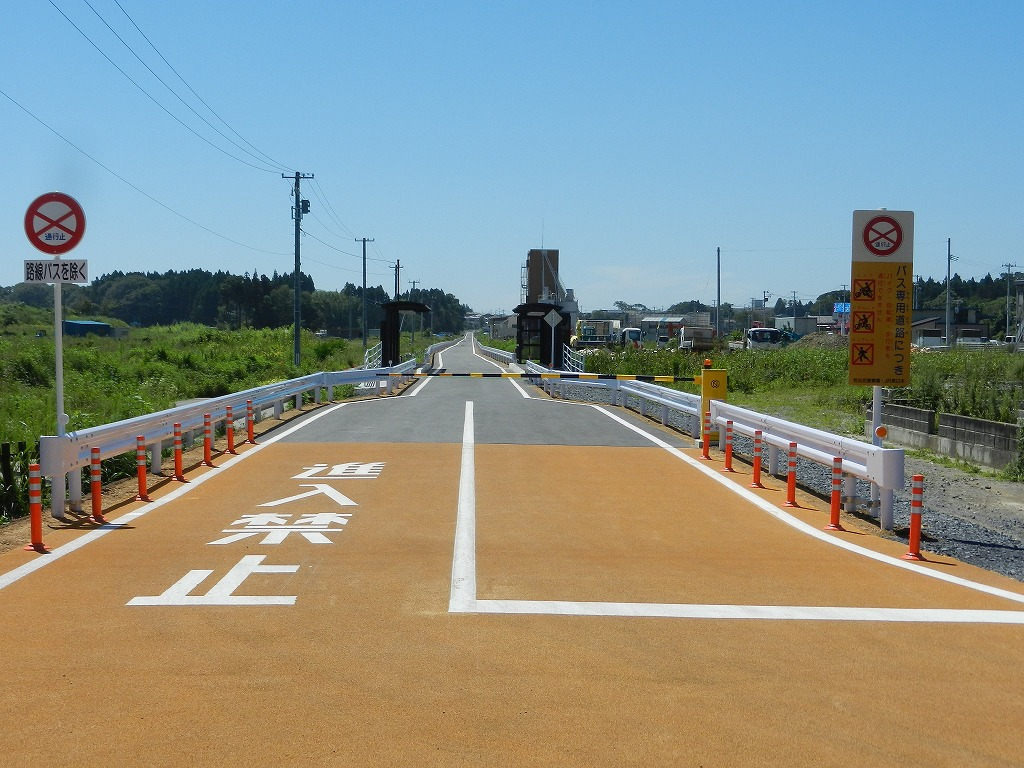
BRT roadway near Saichi Station, completed in 2012

- April 11, 1956: Ōfunato Line begins operation as a freight line between Kesennuma and Kesennuma-Minato stations
- February 11, 1957: Kesennuma Line operates as a passenger line between Minami-Kesennuma and Motoyoshi stations. Ōfunato Freight Line is merged into the Kesennuma Line. Kesennuma to Minami-Kesennuma is open to the public. Minami-Kesennuma, Matsuiwa, Rikuzen-Hashikami, Ōya, Oganezawa, Motoyoshi stations begin operation
- November 10, 1960: Fudōnosawa station begins operation
- July 20, 1967: Saichi station begins operation
- October 24, 1968: Yanaizu Line begins operation between Maeyachi and Yanaizu stations. Wabuchi, Nonodake, Rikuzen-Toyosato, Mitakedō, and Yanaizu stations begin operation
- December 11, 1977: Kesennuma Line connects Motoyoshi and Yanaizu stations. Rikuzen-Yokoyama, Rikuzen-Togura, Shizugawa, Shizuhama, Utatsu, Rikuzen-Minato, Kurauchi and Rikuzen-Koizumi stations begin operation. The freight line between Motoyoshi and Minami-Kesennuma is abolished. Kesennuma Line merges with the Yanaizu Line and runs from Maeyachi to Kesennuma. The freight line runs from Minami-Kesennuma to Kesennuma-Minato.
- November 1, 1979: The remaining freight line is abolished and Kesennuma-Minato station ceases operation.
- April 1, 1987: Kesennuma Line becomes part of JR East.
- March 22, 1997: Ōya station is renamed Ōyakaigan station
- March 11, 2011: Line closed following major damage in 2011 Tōhoku earthquake and tsunami.
- April 29, 2011: Rail service restored on Maeyachi - Yanaizu segment.
- May 7, 2012: Local authorities agree to BRT service to Kesennuma.
- August 20, 2012: BRT roadway completed between Rikuzen-Hashikami and Saichi.
- December 22, 2012: BRT service commences between Yanaizu and Kesennuma.
