= Komagatake Kuniriki =

Japanese sumo wrestler

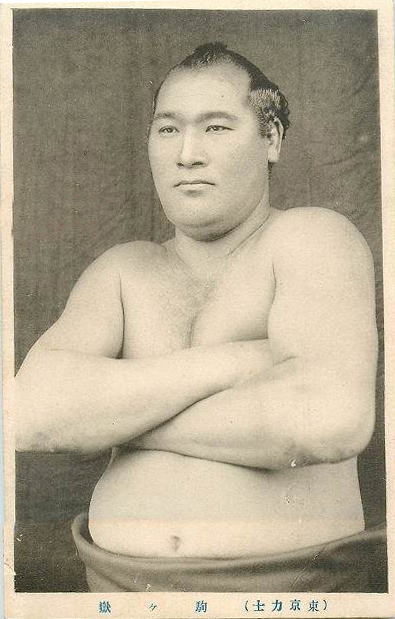

Personal information
- Native name: 駒ヶ嶽 國力
- Born: Kikuchi Kuniriki; December 13, 1880 Wakuya, Miyagi Prefecture; Japan
- Died: April 11, 1914 (aged 33)
- Height: 1.88 m (6 ft 2 in)
- Weight: 135 kg (298 lb; 21.3 st)

Sport
- Sport: Sumo
- Heya: Izutsu
- Record: 124-50-45-24d-7h
- Debut: January 1898
- Highest rank: Ōzeki (January, 1907)
- Updated on March 3, 2023

Komagatake Kuniriki (Japanese: 駒ヶ嶽 國力; born Kikuchi Kuniriki (菊地 國力), December 13, 1880 – April 11, 1914) was a Japanese professional sumo wrestler from Tōda (now Wakuya), Miyagi Prefecture. He wrestled for Izutsu stable and achieved the rank of ōzeki before dying while as an active wrestler in April 1914.

== History ==
Born on December 13, 1880, in Miyagi Prefecture, he was introduced to sumo by Izutsu (yokozuna Nishinoumi Kajirō) when a group led by Konishiki and Asashio Tarō came on a tour in his hometown in 1897. He was promoted in juryō in the January 1902 tournament, and in May 1903 he entered the makuuchi division. Komagatake had a rivalry with Tachiyama Mineemon since their joint makushita debut. Their matches are said to have been particularly popular, to the point that their period of rivalry gave its name to this era, therefore known as the "Koma-Tachi era". Komagatake was promoted to komusubi in January 1905 and sekiwake in May of the same year. He later earned the nickname Enma no Shiokara (閻魔の塩辛), meaning 'Enma's salted fish' after a Japanese saying comparing bitter grins to the difficult face of Enma, who chewed on a bug as if he had tasted salted fish. Komagatake competed with Tachiyama for promotion to ōzeki and was promoted before him in the January 1907 tournament. Hitachiyama Taniemon took particular care of Komagatake and trained him diligently.

He was expected to be promoted to yokozuna, and it was said that he would assume the shikona, or ring name, "Tanikaze", which was supposed to be his legacy since the eponymous yokozuna was also from Miyagi Prefecture. He was known as a good opponent for Tachiyama until Tachiyama became ōzeki, but after Tachiyama was promoted to yokozuna, Komagatake fell behind.

Komagatake was known as a glutton and heavy drinker. In his later years, he drank so much that his body broke down, and when his strength declined and he was defeated, he drank heavily, and after each drink, he became worse, and he even recorded a losing record. On April 11, 1914, while on a tour in Ibaraki Prefecture, he stopped at a liquor store and drank cheap fermented sake, resulting in intestinal perforation and cerebral hemorrhage. Komagatake died suddenly at the age of 33.

A life-size panel is dedicated to Komagatake in the premises of the Wakuya castle, in Miyagi Prefecture. A stone monument was also erected in the Great Temple Sakuragaoka in Sendai.

== Fighting style ==
Komagatake was popular for his dynamic wrestling. He made advantage of his muscular and tall body and was good at throwing and thrusting techniques.

== Top Division Record ==
Komagatake
-	Spring	Summer
1902	West Jūryō #8; 6–2; 2d	West Jūryō #2; 5–5
1903	West Jūryō #2; 8–2	West Maegashira #11; 6–2–1; 1d
1904	West Maegashira #3; 4–3–1; 1d-1h	West Maegashira #1; 4–2–3; 1d
1905	West Komusubi #1; 4–3–2; 1h	West Sekiwake #1; 6–0–3; 1d
1906	West Sekiwake #1; 6–1–1; 2d	West Sekiwake #1; 5–0–3; 1d-1h
1907	West Ōzeki #1; 4–1–2; 3d	West Ōzeki #1; 6–0–3; 1d
1908	West Ōzeki #1; 4–1–5	West Ōzeki #1; 6–2–1; 1d
1909	East Ōzeki #1; 5–3–1; 1d	East Ōzeki #1; 2–3–3; 2d
1910	East Ōzeki #2; 6–0–2; 2h	East Ōzeki #2; 5–3–1; 1d
1911	East Ōzeki #1; 5–1–3; 1d	East Ōzeki #1; 8–1–1d
1912	West Ōzeki #1; 3–5–2	East Ōzeki #1; 6–2; 2d
1913	East Ōzeki #1; 5–2; 1d-2h	West Ōzeki #1; 5–4; 1d
1914	West Ōzeki #1; 0–2–8	x
Record given as win-loss-absent Top Division Champion Top Division Runner-up Retired Lower Divisions Key:d=Draw(s) (引分); h=Hold(s) (預り); Divisions: Makuuchi — Jūryō — Makushita — Sandanme — Jonidan — Jonokuchi Makuuchi ranks: Yokozuna — Ōzeki — Sekiwake — Komusubi — Maegashira

== See also ==
- Glossary of sumo terms
- List of past sumo wrestlers
- List of ōzeki
