= Koganeyama Shrine =

Shinto shrine in Miyagi, Japan

Koganeyama Jinja
- 黄金山神社
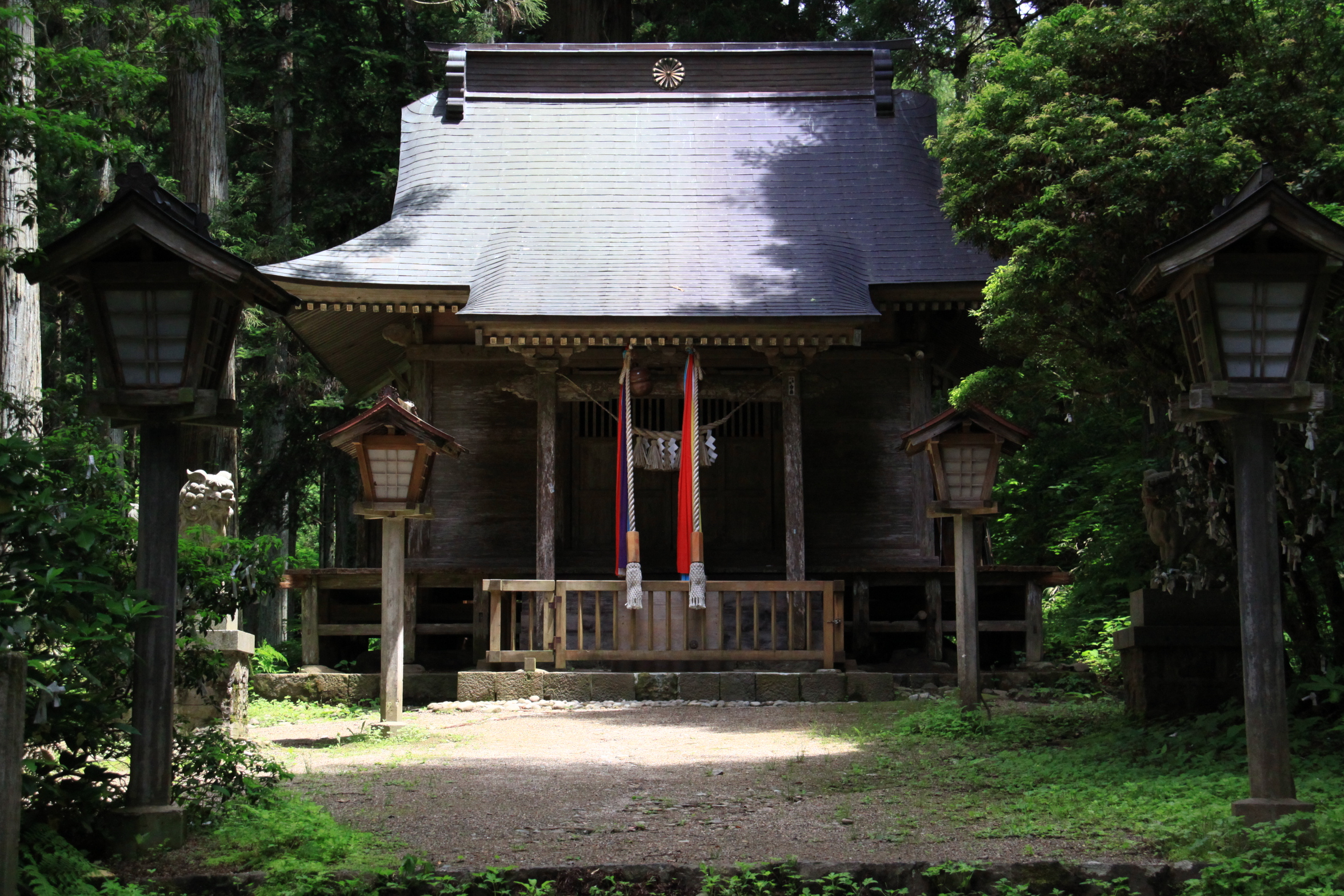
- Haiden of Koganeyama Jinja

- Koganeyama Jinja Koganeyama Shrine (Japan)

Religion
- Affiliation: Shinto
- Deity: Kanayama-hiko-no-kami
- Festival: September 15

Location
- Location: 23 Koganegu-mae, Wakuya-machi, Tōda-gun, Miyagi-ken
- Interactive map of Koganeyama Jinja
- Coordinates: 38°33′35.38″N 141°08′20.93″E

Architecture
- Style: Shinmei-zukuri
- Established: c. 767 AD

Website
- wakuya-koganeyama.info/index2.html

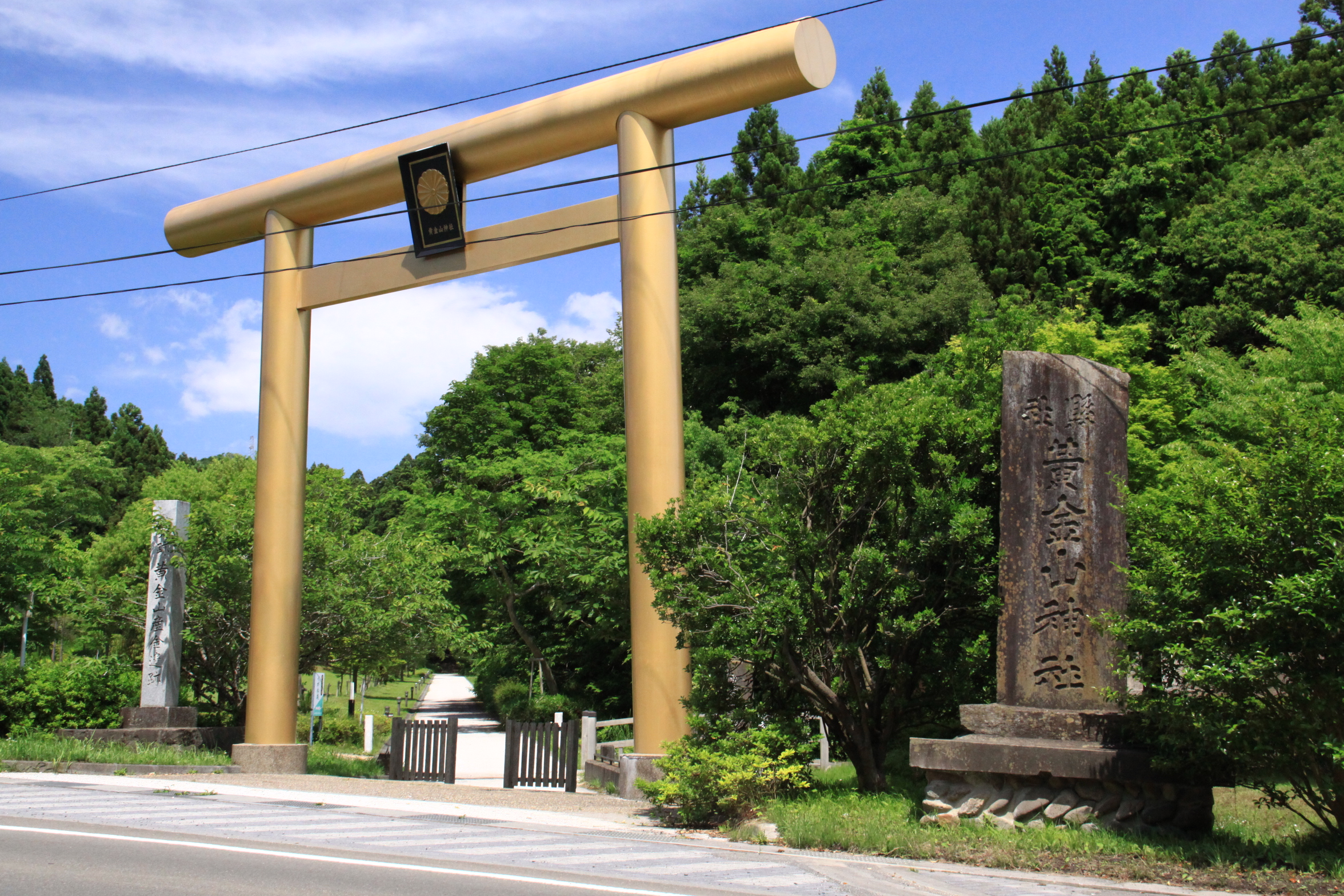
Koganeyama Jinja torii gate

The Koganeyama Jinja (黄金山神社) is a Shintō shrine in the town of Wakuya Tōda District, Miyagi Prefecture in the Tōhoku region of northern Japan. It claims to have been built on the site of the first gold mine in Japan, and is protected by the central government as a National Historic Site.

The main festival of the shrine is held annually on September 15.

== Enshrined kami ==
The primary kami of Koganeyama Jinja is Kanayama-hiko-no-kami (金山彦神).

== History ==
The foundation of the Koganeyama Jinja and the date of discovery of gold in the region are unknown. In 740 AD, when Emperor Shōmu was constructing the Nara Daibutsu, a call was sent out to all provinces requesting the donation of gold for the statue. The ruler of Mutsu Province, Kudara-no-konikishi Kyofuku (a descendant of King Uija of Baekje), responded with 900 ryō of gold (approximately 13 kilograms) from Tōda District, followed by an additional 900 ryō of gold sand two years later. Mention of a shrine at this location is made in the Engishiki records from 767 AD.

The shrine has a haiden but no honden, as the mountain to the rear of the shrine was regarded as the seat of the kami.

The current Shinmei-zukuri style Haiden dates from 1909. Under the Modern system of ranked Shinto shrines, it was ranked as a Prefectural Shrine.

During archaeological investigations conducted in 1957 by Tohoku University, the foundations of Nara period structures and roof tiles were unearthed. The shrine was designated a Miyagi Prefectural Historic Site in 1959 and a National Historic Site in 1967. The shrine is a forty five minute walk from Wakuya Station on the JR East Ishinomaki Line.

== See also ==
- List of Shinto shrines
- List of Historic Sites of Japan (Miyagi)
