= Wakuya =

Wakuya 涌谷町
- Town
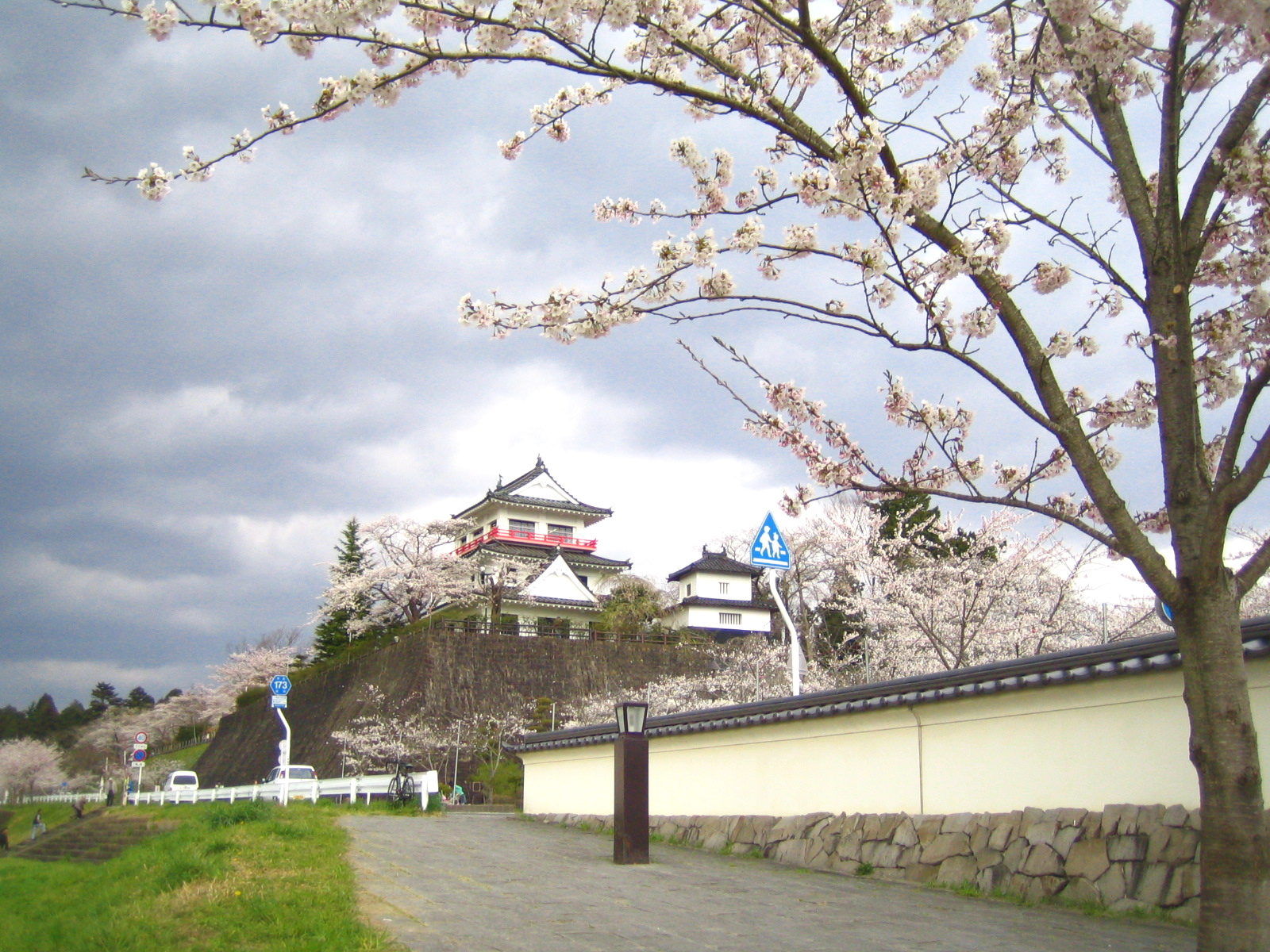
- Wakuya Castle

- Flag Seal

- Location of Wakuya in Miyagi Prefecture

- Coordinates: 38°32′23″N 141°07′41.4″E
- Country: Japan
- Region: Tōhoku
- Prefecture: Miyagi
- District: Tōda

Area
  - Total: 82.16 km^{2} (31.72 sq mi)

Population (April 30, 2020)
  - Total: 15,763
  - Density: 191.9/km^{2} (496.9/sq mi)
- Time zone: UTC+9 (Japan Standard Time)
- Tree: Cryptomeria
- Flower: Sakura
- Phone number: 0229-43-2111
- Address: 153-2 Shinmachiura, Wakuya-chō, Tōda-gun, Miyagi-ken 987-0192
- Website: Official website

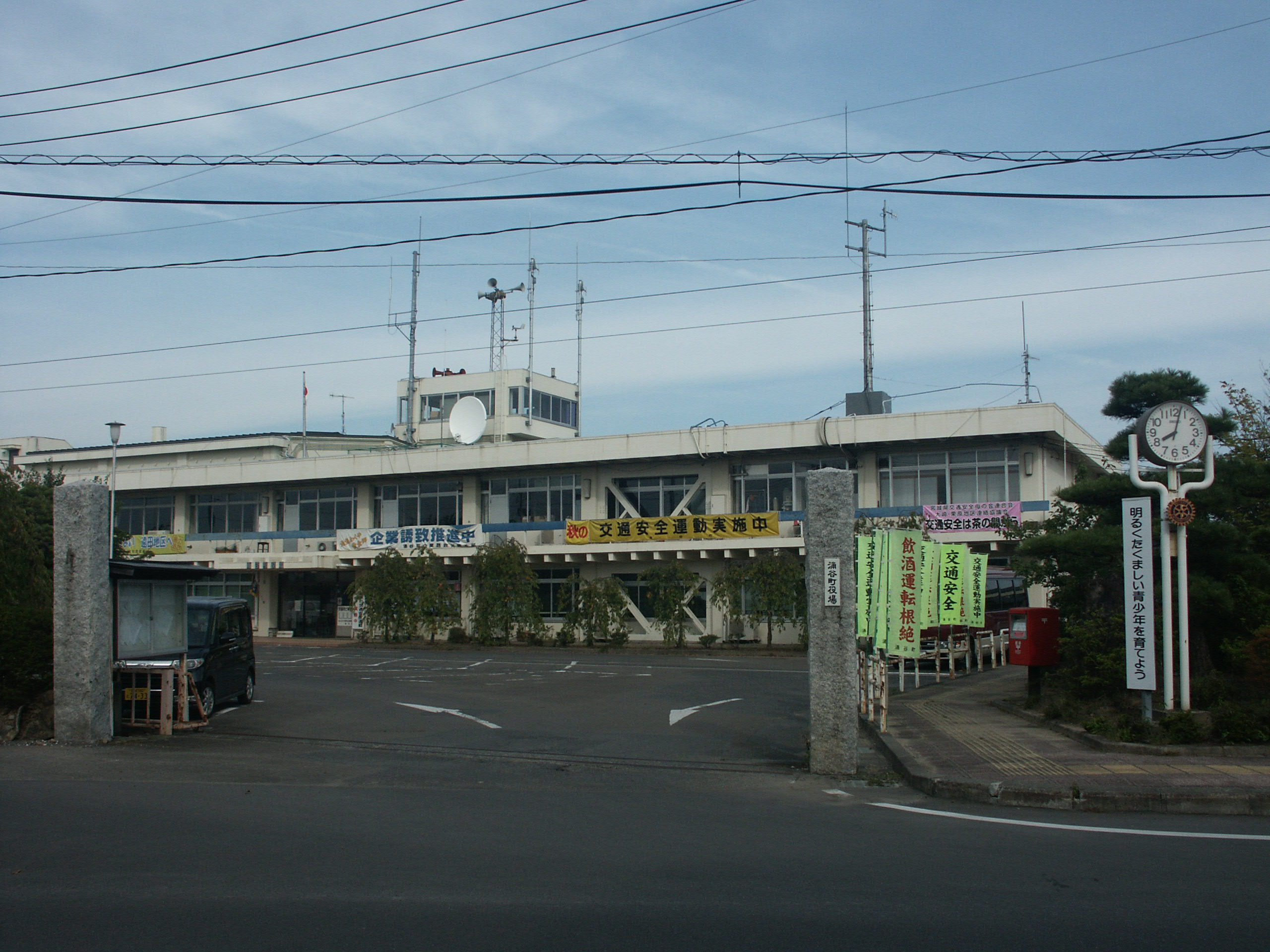
Wakuya town hall

Wakuya (涌谷町, Wakuya-chō) is a town located in Miyagi Prefecture, Japan. As of 30 April 2020, the town had an estimated population of 15,763 in 6028 households, and a population density of 190 persons per km^{2}. The total area of the town is 82.16 square kilometres (31.72 sq mi). The area is noted for its rice production.

== Geography ==
Wakuya is in north-central Miyagi Prefecture in the flatlands of the Ōsaki Plains.

=== Neighboring municipalities ===
Miyagi Prefecture

- Ishinomaki
- Misato
- Ōsaki
- Tome

== Climate ==
Wakuya has a humid subtropical climate (Köppen climate classification Cfa) characterized by mild summers and cold winters. The average annual temperature in Wakuya is 11.0 °C. The average annual rainfall is 1224 mm with September as the wettest month. The temperatures are highest on average in August, at around 23.9 °C, and lowest in January, at around -0.7 °C.

== Demographics ==
Per Japanese census data, the population of Wakuya has declined over the past 40 years.

Historical population
Year	Pop.	±%
1920	14,051	—
1930	16,710	+18.9%
1940	18,423	+10.3%
1950	24,919	+35.3%
1960	23,604	−5.3%
1970	20,935	−11.3%
1980	21,319	+1.8%
1990	20,871	−2.1%
2000	19,313	−7.5%
2010	17,494	−9.4%
2020	15,388	−12.0%

== History ==
The area of present-day Wakuya was part of ancient Mutsu Province, and has been settled since at least the Jōmon period by the Emishi people. During the Nara period, gold was discovered in the area, and 13 kilograms of gold from Wakuya were used in the construction of the Nara Daibutsu. During later portion of the Heian period, the area was ruled by the Northern Fujiwara. During the Sengoku period, the area was contested by various samurai clans before the area came under the control of the Date clan of Sendai Domain during the Edo period, under the Tokugawa shogunate.

The town of Wakuya was established on June 1, 1889, with the establishment of the modern municipalities system. The town annexed the neighboring village of Moto-Wakuya on December 1, 1948, and the village of Nonodake on July 15, 1955. The 2011 Tōhoku earthquake and tsunami destroyed numerous buildings in the town, and resulted in one fatality.

== Government ==
Wakuya has a mayor-council form of government with a directly elected mayor and a unicameral town council of 13 members. Wakuya and the neighboring town of Misato together contribute one seat to the Miyagi Prefectural legislature. In terms of national politics, the town is part of Miyagi 5th district of the lower house of the Diet of Japan.

== Economy ==
The economy of Wakuya is largely based on agriculture, primarily the cultivation of rice, spinach, and spring onions. Alps Electric has a manufacturing plant in Wakuya.

== Education ==
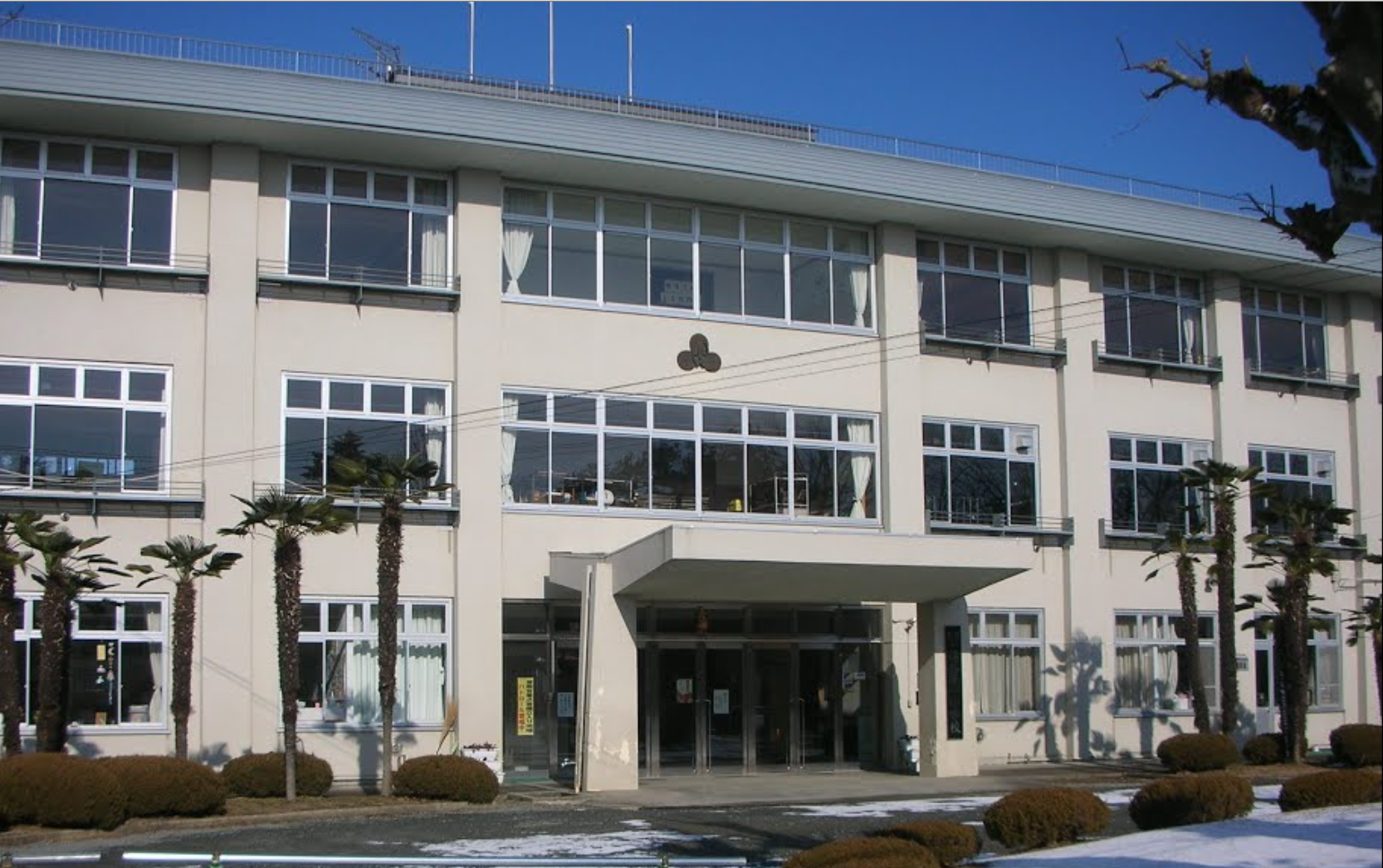
The First Wakuya Elementary school

Wakuya has three public elementary schools (Wakuya No.1 Elementary school (涌谷第一小学校), Gesshoukan Elementary school (月将館小学校), Nonodake Elementary school (箟岳小学校)) and one public junior high school (Wakuya Middle School (涌谷中学校)) operated by the town government. The town has one public high school operated by the Miyagi Prefecturing Board of Education.

== Transportation ==
=== Railway ===
East Japan Railway Company (JR East) - Ishinomaki Line

- Kami-Wakuya - Wakuya

East Japan Railway Company (JR East) - Kesennuma Line

- Nonodake

=== Highway ===
- National Route 108
- National Route 346

== Local attractions ==
- Koganeyama Jinja, a Shinto shrine founded in the Nara period (National Historic Site)
- Nagane Shell Mound, Jōmon period shell midden, National Historic Site
- Wakuya Castle

== Sister cities ==
- Buyeo County, South Korea
- Sorø, Zealand, Denmark

== Noted people from Wakuya ==
- Saitō Chikudō, Edo-period scholar
- Komagatake Kuniriki, Meiji and Taisho-period ōzeki
- Kōji Wakamatsu, film director
- Kiyono Yasuno, voice actress
