= Yanaizu Station (Miyagi) =

Railway station in Tome, Miyagi Prefecture, Japan

Yanaizu Station 柳津駅
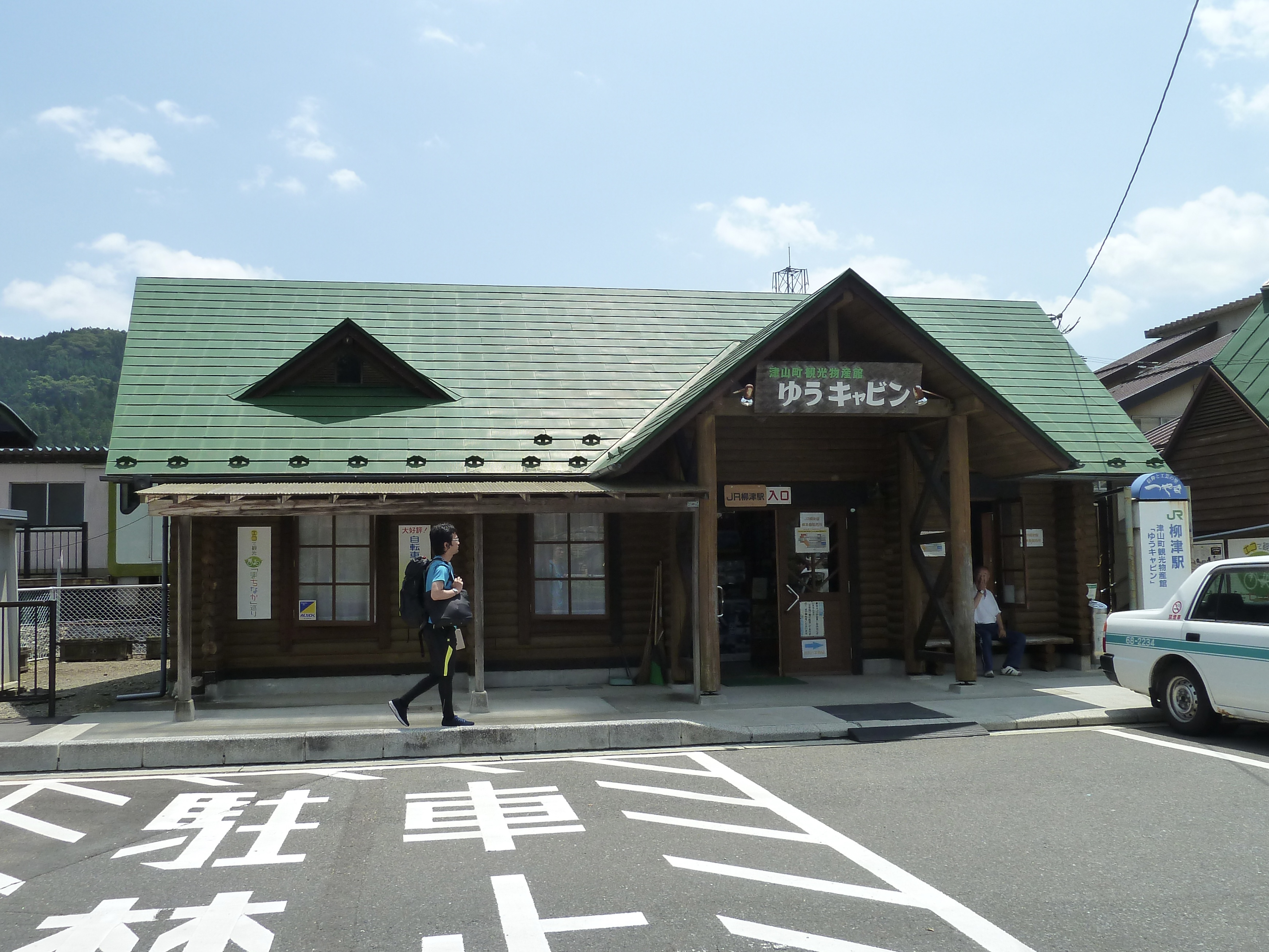
- Yanaizu Station in July 2019

General information
- Location: Tsuyama-cho Yanaizu-aze Tanigi 196, Tome-shi, Miyagi-ken 986-0401; Japan
- Coordinates: 38°36′42.34″N 141°18′20.66″E
- Line: ■ Kesennuma Line
- Distance: 17.6 km from Maeyachi
- Platforms: 1 island platform
- Tracks: 2

Construction
- Structure type: At grade

Other information
- Status: Staffed
- Website: Official website

History
- Opened: October 24, 1968

Passengers
- FY2018: 43 daily

Services
Preceding station	JR East	Following station
Mitakedō towards Kogota	Kesennuma Line	Terminus
Maeyachi Terminus	Kesennuma / Ōfunato BRT	Rikuzen-Yokoyama towards Sakari
Location
- Location within Miyagi Prefecture Location within Japan

Yanaizu Station (柳津駅, Yanaizu-eki) is a junction railway station located in the city of Tome, Miyagi Prefecture, Japan operated by the East Japan Railway Company (JR East) . Since the 2011 tsunami, the station has become the de facto terminal station of the Kesennuma Line, with services beyond the station replaced by a provisional bus rapid transit line.

== Lines ==
Yanaizu Station is served by the Kesennuma Line, and is located 17.6 rail kilometers from the terminus of the line at Maeyachi Station.

== Station layout ==
Yanaizu Station has a single island platform connected to the station building by a footbridge. The station is staffed.

=== Platforms ===
1	■ Kesennuma Line	for Maeyachi and Kogota
2	■ Kesennuma Line	service suspended

== History ==
Yanaizu Station opened on October 24, 1968. The station was absorbed into the JR East network upon the privatization of the Japan National Railways (JNR) on April 1, 1987. Since the 2011 tsunami, the station has become the de facto terminal station of the Kesennuma Line, with services beyond the station replaced by a bus rapid transit line.

== Passenger statistics ==
In fiscal 2018, the station was used by an average of 43 passengers daily (boarding passengers only).

== Surrounding area ==
- National Route 45
- National Route 342
- Yanaizu Post Office

== See also ==
- List of railway stations in Japan
