= Maeyachi Station =

Railway station in Ishinomaki, Miyagi Prefecture, Japan

Maeyachi Station 前谷地駅
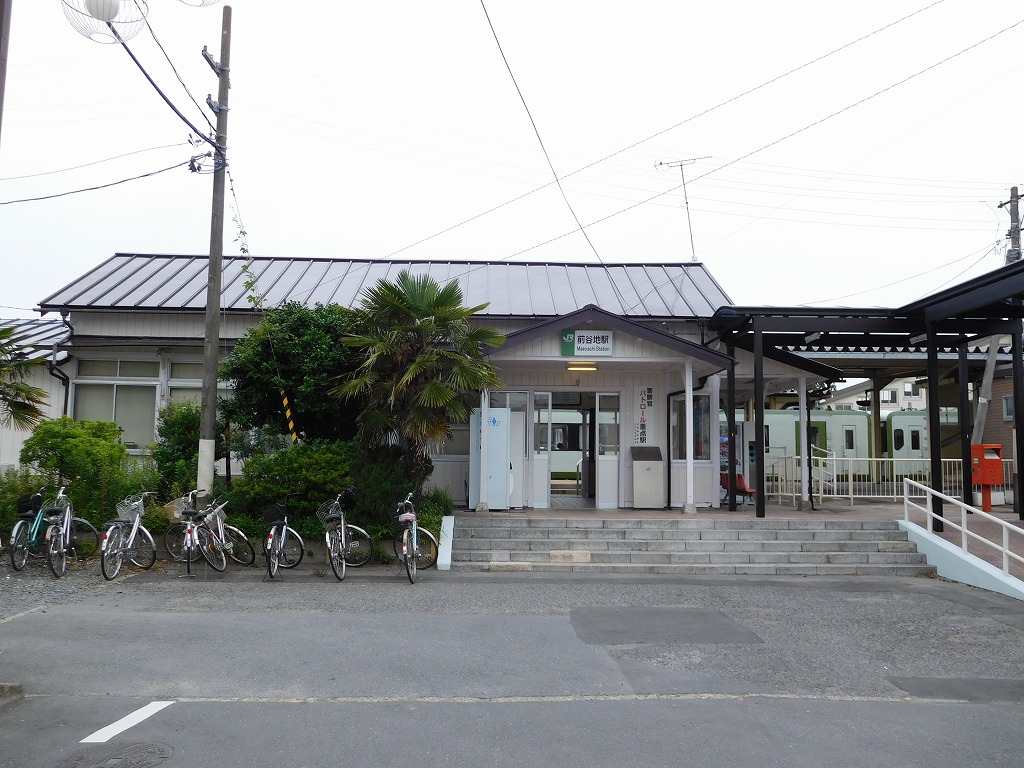
- Maeyachi Station in July 2015

General information
- Location: Maeyachi, Ishinomaki-shi, Miyagi-ken 987-1101; Japan
- Coordinates: 38°30′43″N 141°11′40″E
- Operator: JR East
- Lines: ■ Kesennuma Line; ■ Ishinomaki Line
- Distance: 12.8 km from Kogota
- Platforms: 1 side + 1 island
- Tracks: 3

Construction
- Structure type: At grade

Other information
- Status: Staffed
- Website: Official website

History
- Opened: October 28, 1912

Passengers
- FY2018: 161 daily

Services
Preceding station	JR East	Following station
Wakuya towards Kogota	Ishinomaki Line	Kakeyama towards Onagawa
Wakuya towards Kogota	Kesennuma Line	Wabuchi towards Yanaizu
Terminus	Kesennuma / Ōfunato BRT	Yanaizu towards Sakari
Location
- Location within Miyagi Prefecture Location within Japan

Maeyachi Station (前谷地駅, Maeyachi-eki) is a junction railway station located in the city of Ishinomaki, Miyagi Prefecture, Japan, operated by East Japan Railway Company (JR East).

== Lines ==
Maeyachi Station is served by both the Kesennuma Line and the Ishinomaki Line. It is the southern terminus of the Kesennuma Line and is located 12.8 kilometers from the terminus of the Ishinomaki Line at Kogota Station. Since the March 2011 Tōhoku earthquake and tsunami, services beyond Yanaizu have been replaced by a provisional bus rapid transit line, which also operates starting from this station.

== Station layout ==
The station has one side platform and one island platform connected to the station building by a footbridge. The station is staffed.

=== Platforms ===
1	■ Ishinomaki Line	for Kogota and Sendai
2	■ Ishinomaki Line	for Ishinomaki and Onagawa
2	■ Kesennuma Line	for Yanaizu
3	■ Ishinomaki Line	for Kogota for Ishinomaki
3	■ Kesennuma Line	for Yanaizu

== History ==
Maeyachi Station opened on October 28, 1912. The Yanaizu Line began operations from December 24, 1968, and was extended to Motoyoshi Station to become the Kesennuma Line in 1977. The station was absorbed into the JR East network upon the privatization of Japanese National Railways (JNR) on April 1, 1987. A train was derailed at the station on July 26, 2003, due to a magnitude 6.2 earthquake.

== Passenger statistics ==
In fiscal 2018, the station was used by an average of 161 passengers daily (boarding passengers only).

== Surrounding area ==
- Former Kanan Town Hall
- Kanan Post Office
- National Route 108

== See also ==
- List of railway stations in Japan
