= Motoyoshi =

Motoyoshi may refer to:

- Motoyoshi (name)
- Motoyoshi District, Miyagi, a rural district in Miyagi Prefecture, Japan
- Motoyoshi, Miyagi, a former town in Motoyoshi District
- Motoyoshi Station, a railway station in Kesennuma, Miyagi Prefecture, Japan
