= Motoyoshi, Miyagi =

Dissolved municipality in Miyagi prefecture, Japan

Coordinates: 38°48′N 141°30′E

Location of Motoyoshi in Miyagi Prefecture

Motoyoshi (本吉町, Motoyoshi-chō) was a town located in Motoyoshi District, Miyagi Prefecture, Japan.

In 2003, the town had an estimated population of 11,716 and a population density of 109.80 persons per km^{2}. The total area was 106.70 km^{2}.

Motoyoshi was divided into four districts: Magome, Koizumi, Tsuya, and Ohya. Koizumi and Ohya were both home to spectacular beaches until the disaster of March 11. Tsuya constitutes "downtown" Motoyoshi. Fishing and farming are the main industries though a printing company is also a large local employer. Motoyoshi, like many of Japan's smaller towns, had a declining population as young people increasingly moved to the large regional cities of Kesennuma and Sendai, or further South to Tokyo.

The Motoyoshi Board of Education also employs Assistant Language Teachers (ALTs) that teach English at the local Elementary and Junior High Schools.

A planned merger of municipalities was implemented on September 1, 2009; Motoyoshi was merged into the expanded city of Kesennuma.

== Transportation ==
=== Rail ===
- Kesennuma Line: Kurauchi - Rikuzen-Koizumi - Motoyoshi - Koganezawa - Ōyakaigan

Kesennuma Line is now replaced by a bus service.

=== Major roads ===
- Route 45, Route 346
