= Miyagi 6th district =

Electoral District in Miyagi Prefecture, Japan

Miyagi 6th District
- 宮城県第6区
- Former Parliamentary constituency for the Japanese House of Representatives
- Numbered map of Miyagi Prefecture single-member district (2022 onwards)
- Prefecture: Miyagi
- Proportional District: Tohoku
- Electorate: 253,730

Former constituency
- Created: 1994
- Abolished: 2022
- Seats: One
- Created from: Miyagi 2nd
- Replaced by: Miyagi 5th (Merged into)

Miyagi Prefecture 6th district (宮城県第6区, Miyagi-ken Dai-rokku) was an electoral district for the Japanese House of Representatives. The district was established In 1994 as a single member district from most of Miyagi 2nd district (excluding the city of Ishinomaki and the districts of Monou and Oshika).

Between 2003 and 2024, the seat was held by the Liberal Democratic Party member Itsunori Onodera.

== Areas covered ==
The district was abolished during the 2022 revisions to the seat apportionment for each prefecture. All of the territory that was under the 6th district was merged into the 5th district.

=== Areas 2017–2022 ===
After the 2017 re-zoning, the areas covered by the district were as follows:

- Kesennuma
- Tome
- Kurihara
- Ōsaki
  - The former city of Furukawa and
  - the former towns of Iwadeyama and Naruko

As a result of the rezoning, the town of Minamisanriku and the district of Motoyoshi were transferred from the 6th district to the 5th district.

=== Areas 2013–2017 ===
After the 2013 re-zoning, the areas covered by the district were as follows:

- Kesennuma
- Tome
- Kurihara
- Ōsaki
  - The former city of Furukawa
  - The former towns of Iwadeyama and Naruko
- Motoyoshi District

After this zoning, the 6th ward gained the area covered by the former city of Furukawa and the former towns of Iwadeyama and Naruko from the 4th district.

=== Areas pre-2013 ===
From 1994 until the first rezoning in 2013, the areas covered by the district were as follows:

- Kesennuma
- Tamatsukuri District
- Kurihara District
- Tome District
- Motoyoshi District

== Elected representatives ==
Representative	Party	Years served	Notes
Fukujiro Kikuchi	LDP	1996-1997	Resigned due to a violation of the public election law
Itsunori Onodera	LDP	1997-2000	Resigned due to a violation of the public election law
Masamitsu Oishi	DPJ	2000-2003	
Itsunori Onodera	LDP	2003-2024	Constituency abolished

== Election results ==
‡ Also ran in the Tohoku PR district

‡‡ Ran and won in the Tohoku PR district

2021
Party	Candidate	Votes	%	±%
LDP	Itsunori Onodera^{‡} (incumbent) (endorsed by Komeito)	119,555	83.2	
JCP	Takashi Naito	24,072	16.8	
Turnout		145,590	57.4	
LDP hold				

2017
Party	Candidate	Votes	%	±%
LDP	Itsunori Onodera^{‡} (incumbent) (endorsed by Komeito and the Party for Japanese Kokoro)	123,871	85.7	
JCP	Yuji Yokota	20,638	14.3	
Turnout		146,867	55.3	
LDP hold				

2014
Party	Candidate	Votes	%	±%
LDP	Itsunori Onodera^{‡} (incumbent) (endorsed by Komeito	101,223	70.6	
Democratic	Sayuri Kamata^{‡}	32,797	22.9	
JCP	Takashi Naito	9,351	6.5	
Turnout		145,340	52.2	
LDP hold				

2012
Party	Candidate	Votes	%	±%
LDP	Itsunori Onodera^{‡} (incumbent) (endorsed by Komeito)	97,405	78.1	
Democratic	Sayuri Kamata^{‡}	20,961	16.8	
JCP	Naoya Takamura	6,349	5.1	
Turnout		127,165	57.4	
LDP hold				

2009
Party	Candidate	Votes	%	±%
LDP	Itsunori Onodera^{‡} (incumbent)	100,832	63.7	
Social Democratic	Tetsuo Kanno^{‡} (incumbent - Tohoku PR)	54,133	34.2	
Happiness Realization	Tsugio Ujiie	3,346	2.1	
Turnout		161,273	69.2	
LDP hold				

2005
Party	Candidate	Votes	%	±%
LDP	Itsunori Onodera^{‡} (incumbent)	100,359	63.5	
Social Democratic	Tetsuo Kanno^{‡‡}	49,263	31.2	
JCP	Hisashi Omi	8,354	5.3	
Turnout		160,924	66.5	
LDP hold				

2003
Party	Candidate	Votes	%	±%
LDP	Itsunori Onodera^{‡}	82,750	50.7	
Democratic	Masamitsu Oishi^{‡} (incumbent)	58,420	35.8	
Social Democratic	Tetsuo Kanno^{‡} (incumbent - Tohoku PR)	17,772	10.9	
JCP	Hisashi Omi	4,256	2.6	
Turnout		165,392	67.7	
LDP gain from Democratic				

2000
Party	Candidate	Votes	%	±%
Democratic	Masamitsu Oishi^{‡} (incumbent)	59,588	37.7	
LDP	Kyuichiro Sato^{‡}	44,629	28.2	
Social Democratic	Tetsuo Kanno^{‡‡}	41,470	26.0	
JCP	Yoshiaki Haga	7,427	4.7	
Independent	Tomomi Ito	5,448	3.4	
Turnout				
Democratic hold				

2000 by-election
Party	Candidate	Votes	%	±%
Democratic	Masamitsu Oishi	54,735	47.5	
Social Democratic	Tetsuo Kanno	40,097	34.8	
Independent	Tomomi Ito	11,076	9.6	
JCP	Yoshiaki Haga	9,324	8.1	
Turnout				
Democratic gain from LDP				

1997 by-election
Party	Candidate	Votes	%	±%
LDP	Itsunori Onodera	73,881	49.4	
Independent	Masamitsu Oishi	66,955	44.8	
JCP	Yoshiaki Haga	8,660	5.8	
Turnout				
LDP hold				

1996
Party	Candidate	Votes	%	±%
LDP	Fukujiro Kikuchi	70,765	45.0	
New Frontier	Masamitsu Oishi (incumbent - Miyagi 2nd)	70,114	44.6	
JCP	Yoshiaki Haga	8,171	5.2	
Democratic	Yoshiaki Mikami	7,566	4.8	
Liberal League	Yoshio Chiba	757	0.5	
Turnout			65.3	
LDP win (new seat)				
