= Toyosato, Miyagi =

Toyosato-chō 豊里町
- Former municipality
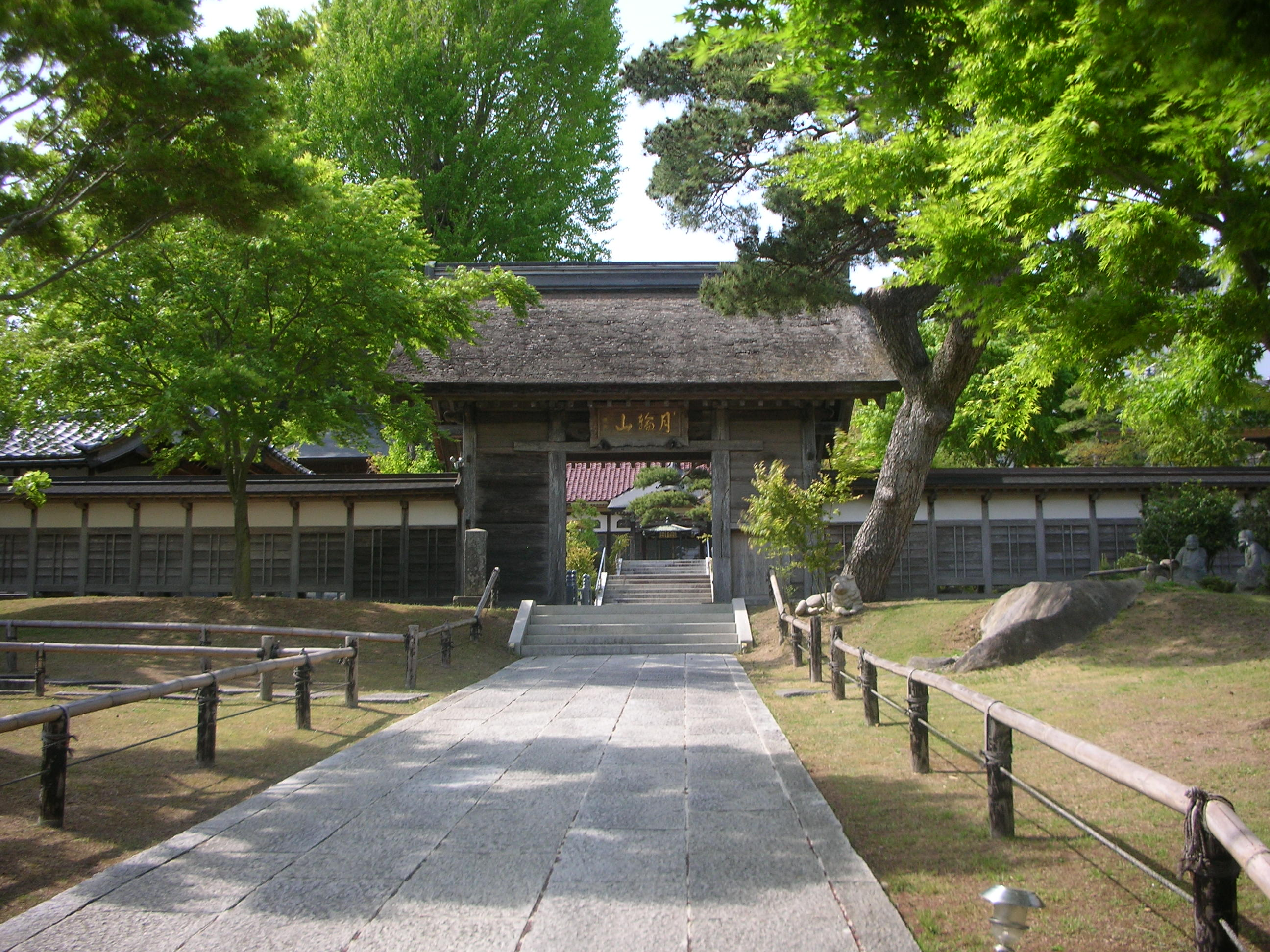
- Korinji Temple

- Location in Japan
- Coordinates: 38°35′N 141°14′E
- Country: Japan
- Region: Tōhoku
- Prefecture: Miyagi Prefecture
- Merged: April 1, 2005 (now part of Tome City)

Area
  - Total: 32.85 km^{2} (12.68 sq mi)

Population (March 1, 2005)
  - Total: 7,194
  - Density: 219.0/km^{2} (567.2/sq mi)
- Time zone: UTC+09:00 (JST)
- Symbols
- Tree: Ginkgo biloba

Toyosato (豊里町, Toyosato-chō) was a town in the former Tome District, Miyagi Prefecture, Japan. It is now a part of the city of Tome.

As of November 2005, the town had an estimated population of 7,194 people and a population density of 219.00 persons per km^{2}. The total area was 32.85 km^{2} (apx. 13 mi^{2}.).

On April 1, 2005, Toyosato, along with the towns of Hasama, Ishikoshi, Minamikata, Nakada, Toyoma, Towa and Yoneyama (all from Tome District) were merged with the town of Tsuyama (from Motoyoshi District) to create the city of Tome.

== Transportation ==
=== Train stations ===
- Kesennuma Line: Rikuzen-Toyosato - Mitakedō

=== Major roads ===
- Sanriku Expressway (Monou-Toyosato interchange)
- Route 346
