= Masamitsu Oishi =

Japanese politician (born 1945)

- 大石 正光

Member of the House of Councillors
- In office 26 July 2004 – 25 July 2010
- Constituency: National PR

Member of the House of Representatives
- In office 27 February 2000 – 10 October 2003
- Preceded by: Itsunori Onodera
- Succeeded by: Itsunori Onodera
- Constituency: Miyagi 6th
- In office 6 July 1986 – 27 September 1996
- Preceded by: Ichirō Hino
- Succeeded by: Constituency abolished
- Constituency: Miyagi 2nd

Personal details
- Born: 28 January 1945 (age 81) Sendai, Miyagi, Japan
- Party: Democratic
- Other political affiliations: LDP (1986–1994); NFP (1994–1996); Independent (1996–2000)
- Children: 2
- Parent: Buichi Ōishi (father)
- Relatives: Ōishi Rinji (grandfather)
- Education: Tokyo University of Marine Science and Technology; Matsushita Institute of Government and Management; University of Tokyo
- Website: Official website

Masamitsu Oishi (大石 正光, Ōishi Masamitsu; born 28 January 1945) is a former Japanese politician of the Democratic Party of Japan, who served in both houses of the National Diet (national legislature). A native of Sendai, Miyagi, he graduated from Rikkyo University and attended Whitworth University in Washington, United States. After having served in the House of Representatives for five terms, he lost his seat in 1996 as a member of the New Frontier Party. He was re-elected in 2000 but lost the seat again in 2003. In 2004 he ran for the House of Councillors and was elected for the first time.
