= Tome, Miyagi =

Tome 登米市
- City
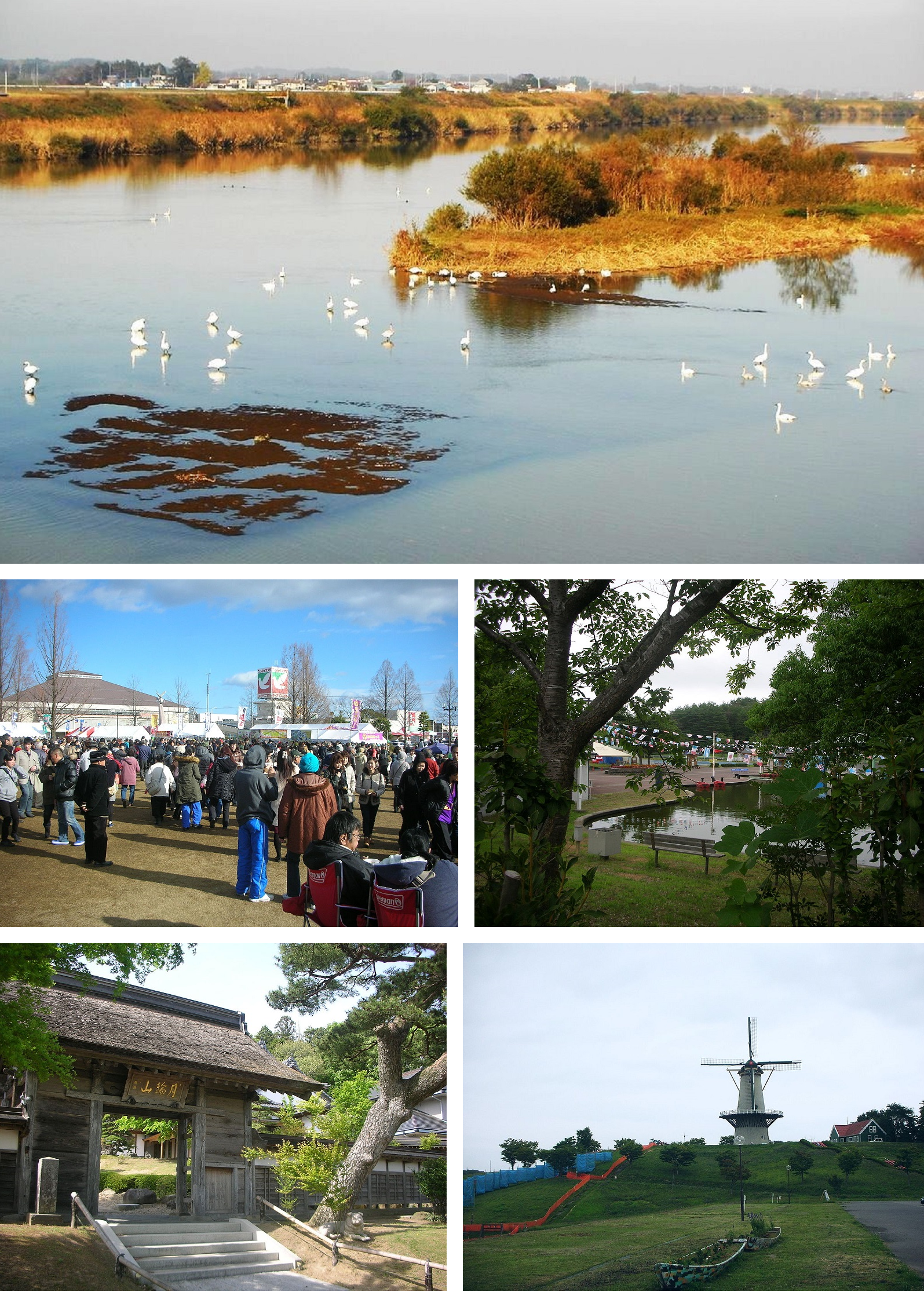
- Upper: Swans on Hasama River; Middle: Japanese number one hatto Festival. Chacha world Ishikoshi; Lower: Korin-ji, Naganuma footopia park

- Flag Seal

- Location of Tome in Miyagi Prefecture

- Coordinates: 38°41′30.6″N 141°11′15.9″E
- Country: Japan
- Region: Tōhoku
- Prefecture: Miyagi
- Town Settled: June 1, 1889
- City Settled: April 1, 2005

Government
  - Mayor: Yasunobu Kumagai (熊谷康信) – since May 2025

Area
  - Total: 536.12 km^{2} (207.00 sq mi)

Population (30 April 2020)
  - Total: 77,897
  - Density: 145.30/km^{2} (376.32/sq mi)
- Time zone: UTC+9 (Japan Standard Time)
- Phone number: 0220-22-2111
- Address: 2–6–1 Nakae, Sanuma, Hasama-chō, Tome-shi, Miyagi-ken 987-0595
- Climate: Cfa
- Website: Official website
- Symbols
- Bird: Swan
- Flower: Sakura
- Tree: Sugi

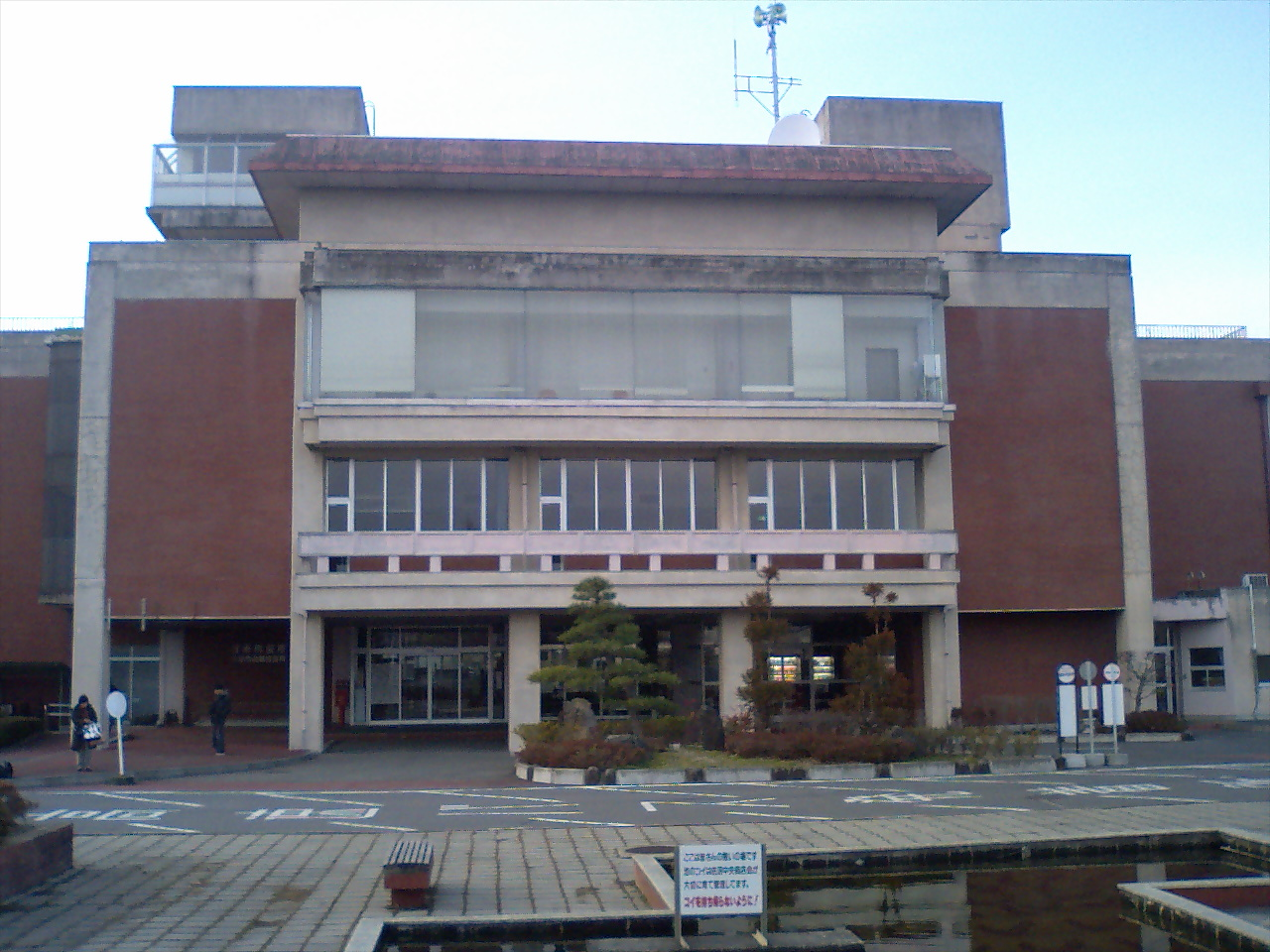
Tome City Hall

Tome (登米市, Tome-shi) is a city located in Miyagi Prefecture, Japan. As of 30 April 2020, the city had an estimated population of 77,897 and a population density of 150 persons per km^{2} in 27,298 households. The total area of the city is 536.12 square kilometres (207.00 sq mi). The area is known for its rice production.

== Geography ==
Tome is in far northeastern Miyagi Prefecture, bordered by Iwate Prefecture to the north. The Kitakami River flows through the city. The city is approximately 70 kilometers north of the prefectural capital of Sendai.

=== Neighboring municipalities ===
Iwate Prefecture

- Ichinoseki

Miyagi Prefecture

- Ishinomaki
- Kesennuma
- Kurihara
- Minamisanriku
- Ōsaki
- Wakuya

== Climate ==
Tome has a humid subtropical climate (Köppen climate classification Cfa) characterized by mild summers and cold winters. The average annual temperature in Tome is 11.5 °C (52.7 °F). The average annual rainfall is 1,078.2 mm (42.45 in) with September as the wettest month. The temperatures are highest on average in August, at around 23.8 °C (74.8 °F), and lowest in January, at around −0.1 °C (31.8 °F).

Climate data for Yoneyama, Tome (elevation 4 m, 1991–2020 normals, extremes 1976–present)
Month	Jan	Feb	Mar	Apr	May	Jun	Jul	Aug	Sep	Oct	Nov	Dec	Year
Record high °C (°F)	15.7 (60.3)	19.7 (67.5)	24.4 (75.9)	30.4 (86.7)	33.5 (92.3)	34.1 (93.4)	37.5 (99.5)	36.3 (97.3)	35.3 (95.5)	30.5 (86.9)	24.1 (75.4)	20.3 (68.5)	37.5 (99.5)
Mean daily maximum °C (°F)	4.6 (40.3)	5.8 (42.4)	10.0 (50.0)	15.9 (60.6)	20.6 (69.1)	23.8 (74.8)	27.1 (80.8)	28.6 (83.5)	25.1 (77.2)	19.8 (67.6)	13.4 (56.1)	7.1 (44.8)	16.8 (62.2)
Daily mean °C (°F)	−0.1 (31.8)	0.6 (33.1)	4.0 (39.2)	9.4 (48.9)	15.1 (59.2)	19.0 (66.2)	22.5 (72.5)	23.8 (74.8)	20.1 (68.2)	14.0 (57.2)	7.6 (45.7)	2.2 (36.0)	11.5 (52.7)
Mean daily minimum °C (°F)	−4.5 (23.9)	−4.2 (24.4)	−1.6 (29.1)	3.3 (37.9)	10.4 (50.7)	15.3 (59.5)	19.3 (66.7)	20.4 (68.7)	15.9 (60.6)	8.7 (47.7)	2.2 (36.0)	−2.1 (28.2)	6.9 (44.4)
Record low °C (°F)	−17.5 (0.5)	−18.3 (−0.9)	−13.6 (7.5)	−7.6 (18.3)	1.1 (34.0)	6.8 (44.2)	11.3 (52.3)	11.6 (52.9)	4.6 (40.3)	−1.9 (28.6)	−6.1 (21.0)	−19.5 (−3.1)	−19.5 (−3.1)
Average precipitation mm (inches)	35.5 (1.40)	29.1 (1.15)	69.9 (2.75)	77.3 (3.04)	93.6 (3.69)	111.2 (4.38)	161.6 (6.36)	120.1 (4.73)	150.6 (5.93)	129.4 (5.09)	58.6 (2.31)	41.4 (1.63)	1,078.2 (42.45)
Average precipitation days (≥ 1.0 mm)	5.8	5.7	7.9	8.5	9.5	9.8	12.7	10.4	10.8	8.9	7.3	6.9	104.2
Mean monthly sunshine hours	149.4	158.7	177.1	189.6	195.9	158.1	141.3	156.3	131.5	139.8	137.5	136.5	1,871.6
Source: Japan Meteorological Agency (1991–2020 normals, extremes 1976–present)

== Demographics ==
Per Japanese census data, the population of Tome peaked in the 1950s and has declined steadily over the past 70 years.

Historical population
Year	Pop.	±%
1920	77,807	—
1930	88,911	+14.3%
1940	98,905	+11.2%
1950	128,416	+29.8%
1960	122,386	−4.7%
1970	102,525	−16.2%
1980	98,568	−3.9%
1990	98,231	−0.3%
2000	93,769	−4.5%
2010	83,969	−10.5%
2020	76,037	−9.4%

== History ==
The area of present-day Tome was part of ancient Mutsu Province, and has been settled since at least the Jōmon period by the Emishi people. During the later portion of the Heian period, the area was ruled by the Northern Fujiwara. During the Sengoku period, the area was contested by various samurai clans before the area came under the control of the Date clan of Sendai Domain during the Edo period, under the Tokugawa shogunate.

The town of Tome was established on June 1, 1889, within Tome District, Miyagi with the establishment of the modern municipalities system. The city of Tome was established on April 1, 2005, from the merger of the towns of Hasama, Ishikoshi, Minamikata, Nakada, Toyoma, Towa, Toyosato, Tsuyama, and Yoneyama (all from Tome District), and the town of Tsuyama (from Motoyoshi District). Tome District was dissolved as a result of his merger.

=== 2011 earthquake and tsunami ===
Tome was one of several cities severely affected by an earthquake and tsunami on Friday, 11 March 2011, with as many as 6,000 people left homeless. On 15, 2011, authorities announced that German and Swiss teams with search dogs would be deployed to the city to aid in search and recovery efforts. Other search and rescue team came from Australia and New Zealand. Early reports suggest that many residents of the nearby town of Minamisanriku, which was one of the hardest hit by the tsunami, had evacuated to Tome.

== Government ==
Tome has a mayor-council form of government with a directly elected mayor and a unicameral city legislature of 26 members. Tome contributes two seats to the Miyagi Prefectural legislature. In terms of national politics, after the abolishment of the Miyagi 6th district in 2022, the city is part of Miyagi 5th district of the lower house of the Diet of Japan.

== Economy ==
The economy of Tome is largely based on agriculture. The city is one of the leading agricultural production areas in the Tōhoku region, with rice cultivation concentrated on the plains formed by the Hasama and Kitakami rivers. Tome is among Miyagi Prefecture's largest rice-producing municipalities and is known for the cultivation of the "Hitomebore" variety.

== Education ==
Tome has 21 public elementary schools, one combined public elementary/middle school, nine public junior high schools operated by the city government, and three public high schools operated by the Miyagi Prefectural Board of Education.

== Transportation ==
=== Railway ===
East Japan Railway Company (JR East) – Tōhoku Main Line

- Umegasawa – Nitta – Ishikoshi

East Japan Railway Company (JR East) – Kesennuma Line

- Rikuzen-Toyosato – Mitakedō – Yanaizu – Rikuzen-Yokoyama

=== Highway ===
- Tōhoku Expressway: (Tsukidate and Wakayanagi interchanges)
- Sanriku Expressway: (Monou-Toyosato, Toyoma (Tome), Towa/Mitakido, and Monou-Tsuyama interchanges)
- National Route 45
- National Route 342
- National Route 346
- National Route 398
- National Route 456

== Local attractions ==
- Toyoma Education Museum
- Naganuma Futopia Park

== Sister cities ==
Tome is twinned with:

- Nyūzen, Japan
- Southlake, United States
- Vernon, Canada

== Noted people from Tome ==
- Maruyama Gondazaemon, sumo
- Shotaro Ishinomori, manga artist
- Katsuhiro Otomo, manga artist
- Kouzou Sasaki, politician
- Shio Satō, manga artist
- Shinobu Sugawara, Japanese professional wrestler
