= Karakuwa, Miyagi =

Karakuwa 唐桑町
- Former municipality
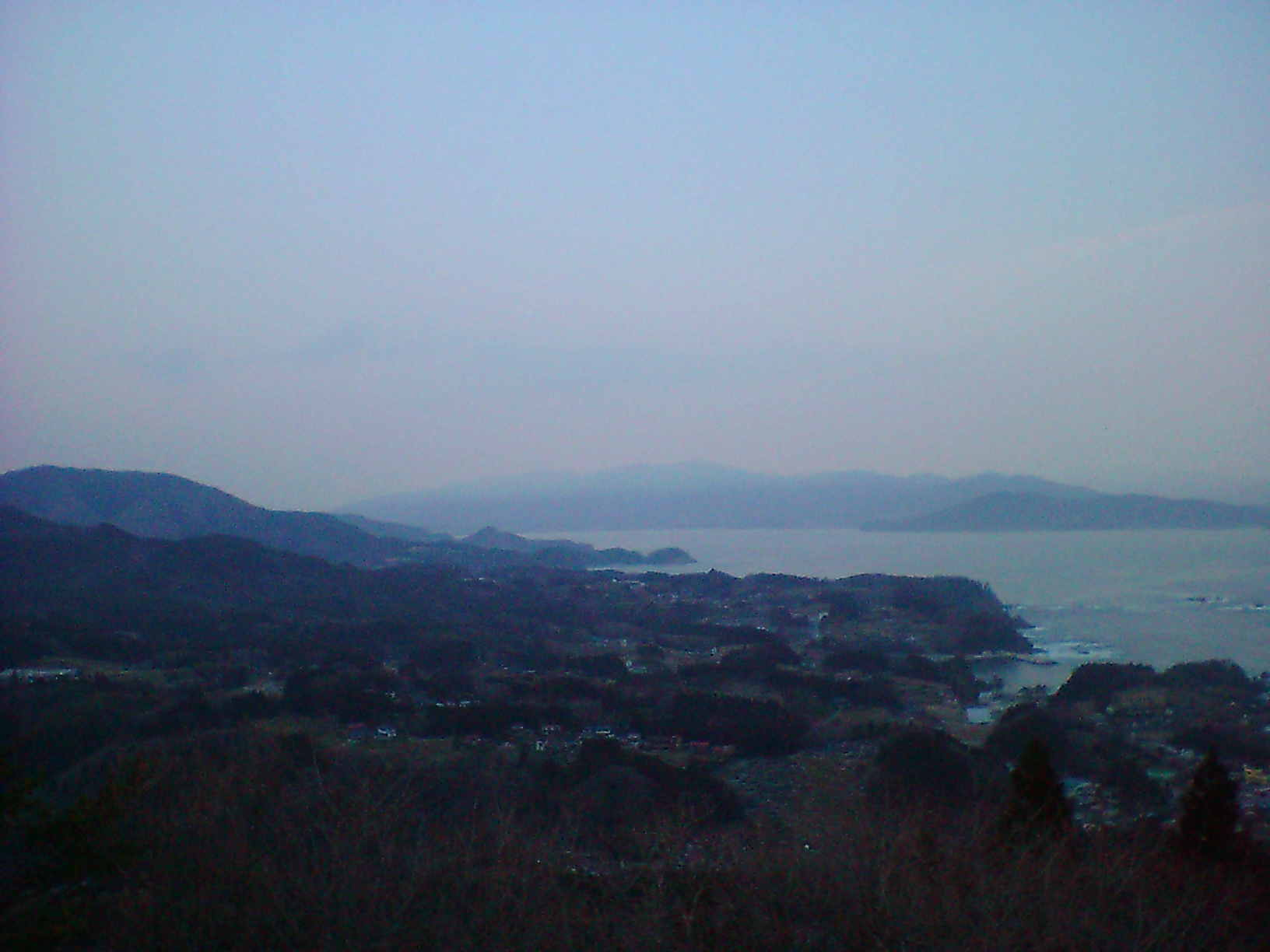
- Northern Karakuwa coastline, with Iwate prefecture in the background, taken from the top of Isaribi Park

- Location in Japan
- Coordinates: 38°55′N 141°39′E
- Country: Japan
- Region: Tōhoku
- Prefecture: Miyagi Prefecture
- Merged: March 31, 2006 (now part of Kesennuma)

Area
  - Total: 42.29 km^{2} (16.33 sq mi)

Population (2005)
  - Total: 8,463
  - Density: 200/km^{2} (520/sq mi)
- Time zone: UTC+09:00 (JST)
- Website: city.kesennuma.lg.jp
- Symbols
- Flower: Camellia
- Tree: Pine

Karakuwa (唐桑町, Karakuwa-chō) was a town located in Motoyoshi District, in the extreme northeast of Miyagi Prefecture, bordering Kesennuma to the north-west and Rikuzentakata, part of Iwate Prefecture, to the north, and with Kesennuma Bay including Oshima island to the west, Hirota Bay to the north-east, and the Pacific Ocean to the south and east.

On March 31, 2006, Karakuwa was merged into the expanded city of Kesennuma and is no longer an independent municipality.

The highest point in former Karakuwa is Sasanagane-yama (笹長根山 meaning 'bamboo grass with long roots mountain') (520 m), near the border with Rikuzentakata, and the lowest point is sea level.

== Name origin ==
Karakuwa's name (唐桑) literally means "China (Tang dynasty, specifically) Mulberry", and has been used to refer to the area back to the times when it was part of a larger Kesen District in Mutsu Province. According to the story of where the name came from, a Chinese shipwrecked on the rocky coast, and in its hold was a mulberry tree. The tree was rescued and planted, and it survived and spread to become common in the area, as did the legend.

== History ==
Around 700 A.D., there is record of Emishi presenting local marine products at the Imperial Court, which may have encouraged immigration to the area. The area remained peaceful during the Nara period, due to the powerful influence of the Minamoto clan. However, during the Heian period, the Minamotos were defeated by Taira no Kiyomori in the Heiji rebellion. The Kasai Clan received the region but were left heirless near the end of the Azuchi–Momoyama period. After the Battle of Sekigahara in 1600, the area was given to Date Masamune as part of his lands.

During the Meiji Restoration, it was taken from the Date clan as punishment for their involvement and given to the Takasaki Clan to administer, becoming part of Motoyoshi District in 1868, then becoming part of several short-lived prefectures before finally becoming part of Miyagi Prefecture on April 18, 1876.

In 1889, the two villages in the area, Karakuwa and Koharagi (小原木 meaning 'small, original tree') merged to form a larger village called Karakuwa, then incorporated into a town in 1955.

In 2004 and 2005, there were discussions with Motoyoshi and Kesennuma regarding a merge to create a larger city. Although Motoyoshi withdrew from the talks, an agreement to merge was made with Kesennuma. On March 31, 2006, Karakuwa ceased to exist as a separate town.

== Geography ==
The town center was located at the base of a rocky peninsula which juts out into the Pacific Ocean, a small extension of the north–south running mountains in the area. Most of the underlying rock is granite, though there is significant marble as well. These hard rock mountains make the land an abundance of sharp hills and valleys, and also give the area many small bays. There is some farmland, but the hills make large open fields impossible.

Like much of Japan, Karakuwa is prone to earthquakes. Large earthquakes with centers in the ocean from those off western Hokkaido to those off to Oshika peninsula to the south have been felt in the area. Tsunami can also be a danger; in recent times, large waves hit the area after a local earthquake in 1896, and after the Chilean earthquake of 1960.

The peninsula area of the former town, from the town center to the south-east is about 3 km (1.9 mi) long, and about 1 km (0.62 mi) wide. The town extended another 4 km (2.5 mi) up the coastline to include the Koharagi area, and 1 km (0.62 mi) along the coast facing Oshima island. There are a few small streams along the peninsula, the largest stretching 2 km (1.2 mi) inland towards Sasanagane-yama, which lies another kilometer (0.6 miles) beyond the streams source at the widest point in Karakuwa.

== Economy ==
The local economy has some mixed farming, including a few apple orchards, but due to the rocky granite and marble coastline, which favours small ports over farmland, the focus is on commercial deep-sea fishing. There is also some commercial activity in processing the catch, and the rugged beauty of the coastline encourages significant tourism.

== Education ==
There are three elementary schools and two junior high schools in former Karakuwa. Nakai (中井小学校 -shōgakkō) and Karakuwa Elementary in the south feed Karakuwa Junior High, and in the north Koharagi Elementary students go to Koharagi Junior High. There were no high schools in the town; students must go to Kesennuma, Rikuzentakata or farther to continue their education.

== Transportation ==
- Route 45, to Sendai via Kesennuma, major highway
- Route 26, to Kesennuma, older, winding highway
- Route 239, connects Route 45 and 26 along the east coast of the Karakuwa peninsula
- JR East Kesennuma Line (rail), to Maeyachi Station in Ishinomaki with connections to Sendai from Kesennuma Station in Kesennuma
- JR East Ōfunato Line (rail), to Ichinoseki Station in Ichinoseki and Sakari Station in Ōfunato from Shishiorikarakuwa Station or Kesennuma Station in Kesennuma.

(Note: There are no train stations in Karakuwa itself. Kesennuma and Ōfunato Line is now replaced by a bus service.)

== Tourist attractions ==
- Oogama-Hanzou (巨釜ー半造) is located off Route 26, on the east coast of the Karakuwa peninsula. It is a park area with walking trails along the rugged, dark marble of the coastline. The feature attraction and the former town's symbol, Oreishi (折石), is here, a marble column rising from the ocean which stands 16 m tall and 3 m wide. Prior to the Sanriku tsunami breaking off the top in 1896, it stood an additional 2 m taller.
- Osaki Shrine (御崎神社; meaning 'shrine on land looking over water') is located at the end of Route 26 at the southernmost tip of the Karakuwan peninsula. A large shrine is here, with paths with branches entwined above and more views of the rocky coastline. A connecting path leads up the coast to eventually join with Oogama-Hanzou. The Karakuwa Tsunami Museum is located in the same area. Built in 1984, it's billed as the only place in Japan where you can feel the simulated experience of a tsunami.
- Isaribi Park (漁火パーク; meaning 'fishing fire park') is located off Route 26. Isaribi Park contains the highest point on the Karakuwan peninsula, a restaurant, gift shop, small playground and go-kart track are at the base. A short climb to the top reveals a small shrine and a lookout that allows views of the Karakuwan peninsula to the south, Oshima island and Kesennuma to the west, and Iwate to the northeast.
- 9-9 Sound Beach (九九鳴き浜) is located off Highway 26 between the former town centre and Kesennuma, with an approximately three-kilometre walk from the access point to the beach. The beach is so named because the mixed porcelain, granite, and sandstone of the beach is said to make a 'kyuu-kyuu' or 'ku-ku' sound when walked on. (Kyuu (きゅう) and ku (く) are the two pronunciations of the number nine (九) in Japanese.)
- Dairiseki Coast (大理石海岸; meaning 'marble coast') is located off Highway 45 close to the Miyagi-Iwate border. The coastline of this area features white marble, contrasting the darker colours found in most of the area.
- The entire coastline of Karakuwa forms part of Rikuchu Coast National Park. (陸中海岸国立公園)
