= No.18 Kyotoku-maru =

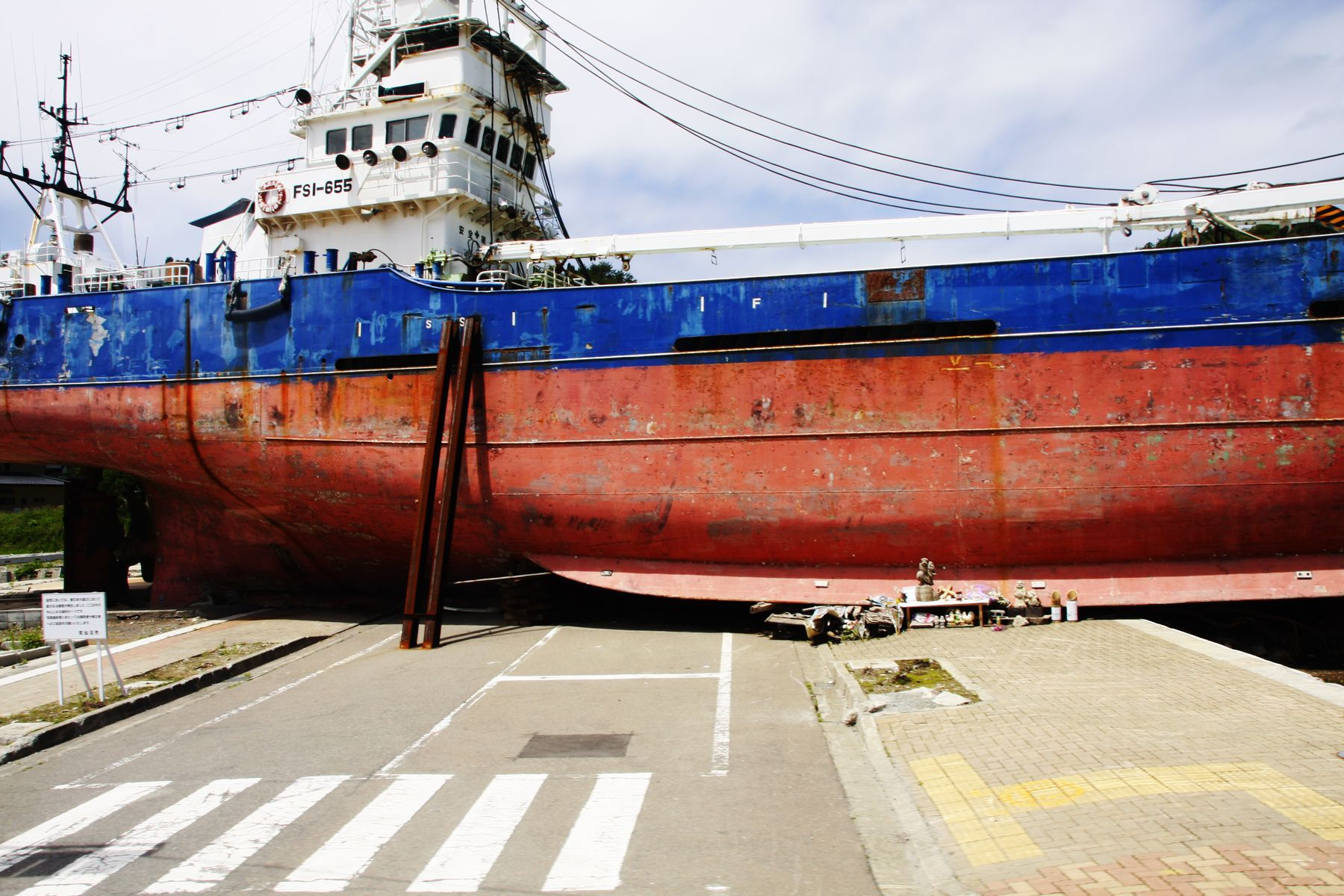

Kyotoku-maru no. 18 is a fishing trawler which was swept inland during tsunami that followed the 2011 Tōhoku earthquake and tsunami, in the city of Kesennuma, Miyagi in Japan.

In August 2013 residents voted to scrap the boat, instead of keeping it as a monument. Work to dismantle the ship started on September 9, 2013.
