= Toyoma, Miyagi =

Dissolved municipality in Miyagi prefecture, Japan

Toyoma (登米町, Toyoma-machi) was a town in the former Tome District, Miyagi Prefecture, Japan. It is now a part of the city of Tome.

As of 2003, the town had an estimated population of 5,790 and a population density of 126.78 persons per km^{2}. The total area was 45.67 km^{2}.

On April 1, 2005, Toyoma, along with the towns of Hasama, Ishikoshi, Minamikata, Nakada, Towa, Toyosato and Yoneyama (all from Tome District) were merged with the town of Tsuyama (from Motoyoshi District) to create the city of Tome.
