= Naganuma Futopia Park =

Park in Tome, Miyagi, Japan

Coordinates: 38.6891°N 141.1344°E

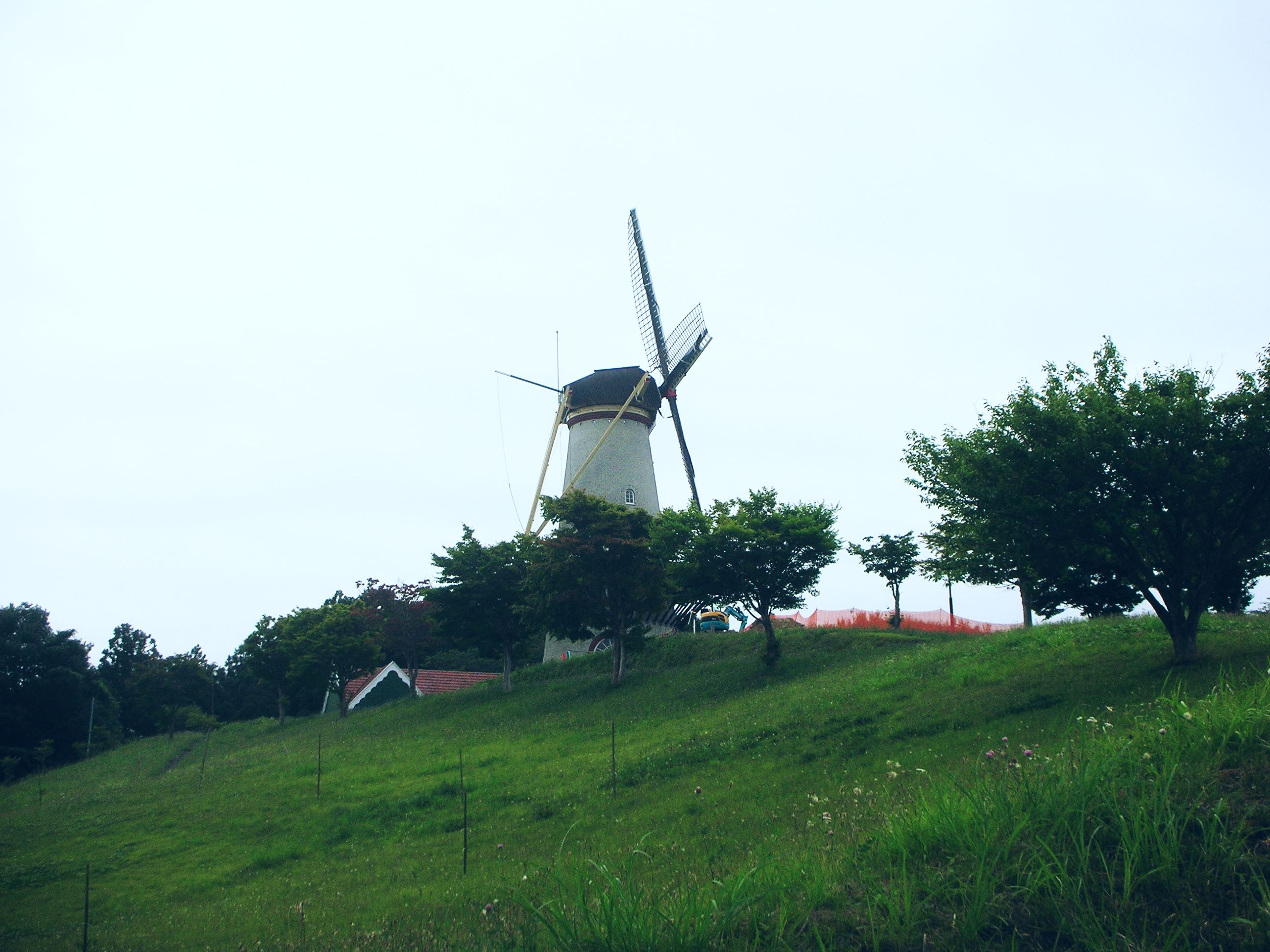
- Interactive map of Naganuma Futopia Park
- Location: Hasamachokitakata, Tome, Miyagi Prefecture, Japan
- Parking: Yes
- Website: Official site

Naganuma Futopia Park is a park in Hasamachokitakata in Tome, Miyagi, Japan. The park is known for its Dutch windmill, which was built in 1991.
