= Shizugawa, Miyagi =

Dissolved municipality in Miyagi prefecture, Japan

Coordinates: 38°40′N 141°27′E

Shizugawa (志津川町, Shizugawa-chō) was a town located in Motoyoshi District, Miyagi Prefecture, Japan.

In 2003, the town had an estimated population of 13,688 and a population density of 110.16 persons per km^{2}. The total area was 124.25 km^{2}. Shizugawa has both a junior high school and a high school.

On October 1, 2005, Shizugawa, merged with the town of Utatsu (also from Motoyoshi District) to create the town of Minamisanriku, and no longer exists as an independent municipality.

Shizugawa was severely affected by the 2011 Tōhoku tsunami, with great destruction and large loss of life. The tsunami topped the seawall, and buildings as tall as four stories were then totally immersed.
