= Utatsu, Miyagi =

Dissolved municipality in Miyagi prefecture, Japan

Utatsu (歌津町, Utatsu-chō) was a town located in Motoyoshi District, Miyagi Prefecture, Japan.

In 2003, the town had an estimated population of 5,501 and a population density of 139.34 persons per km^{2}. The total area was 39.48 km^{2}.

On October 1, 2005, Utatsu merged with the town of Shizugawa (also from Motoyoshi District) to create the town of Minamisanriku, and no longer exists as an independent municipality.
