= Itsunori Onodera =

Japanese politician (born 1960)

- 小野寺 五典
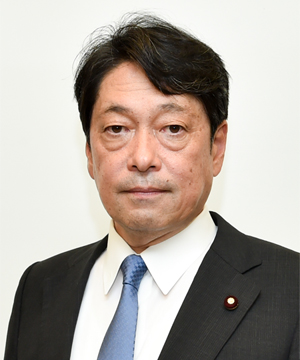
- Official portrait, 2017

Chairman of the Liberal Democratic Party Policy Research Council
- In office 30 September 2024 – 7 October 2025
- President: Shigeru Ishiba
- Preceded by: Kisaburo Tokai
- Succeeded by: Takayuki Kobayashi

Minister of Defense
- In office 3 August 2017 – 2 October 2018
- Prime Minister: Shinzo Abe
- Preceded by: Tomomi Inada; Fumio Kishida (acting)
- Succeeded by: Takeshi Iwaya
- In office 26 December 2012 – 3 September 2014
- Prime Minister: Shinzo Abe
- Preceded by: Satoshi Morimoto
- Succeeded by: Akinori Eto

Member of the House of Representatives
- Incumbent
- Assumed office 10 November 2003
- Preceded by: Masamitsu Oishi
- Constituency: Miyagi 6th (2003–2024); Miyagi 5th (2024–present)
- In office 1 January 1997 – 3 January 2000
- Preceded by: Masamitsu Oishi
- Succeeded by: Fukujiro Kikuchi
- Constituency: Miyagi 6th

Personal details
- Born: 5 May 1960 (age 66) Kesennuma, Miyagi, Japan
- Party: Liberal Democratic
- Children: 2
- Education: Tokyo University of Marine Science and Technology; Matsushita Institute of Government and Management; University of Tokyo
- Website: Official website

Itsunori Onodera (小野寺 五典, Onodera Itsunori; born 5 May 1960) is a Japanese politician of the Liberal Democratic Party and a member of the House of Representatives in the Diet (national legislature). He served as the Minister of Defense from 2012 to 2014 and again from 2017 to 2018.

== Early life and education ==
A native of Kesennuma, Miyagi, Onodera was born on May 5, 1960. He received a bachelor's degree from Tokyo University of Fisheries in 1983. He entered the Matsushita Institute of Government and Management in 1990. Then he studied politics at the University of Tokyo. He graduated from both and obtained his master's degree in political science in 1993.

== Career ==
Onodera joined the government of Miyagi Prefecture in April 1983. He worked at Tohoku Fukushi University as special lecturer, assistant professor and guest professor from April 1994 to January 1998. He was elected to the House of Representatives for the first time in December 1997 from Miyagi Prefecture No. 6, but resigned in 2000 in the wake of an electoral donation scandal. In October 2002, he became an associate professor at Tohoku Fukushi University. However, he ran for the house in 2003 and was re-elected. He served as parliamentary secretary for foreign affairs for two times from 2004 to 2005. He served at and chaired different committees regarding foreign affairs, and was the head of the LDP's foreign affairs division. He was appointed senior vice-minister for foreign affairs in August 2007.

Shinzo Abe named Itsunori Onodera defense minister on 26 December 2012. Like Abe, the majority of his government, and many predecessors as defense ministers, Onodera is affiliated with the revisionist lobby group Nippon Kaigi. Onodera supports Japan having the ability to launch a first-strike attack against enemy bases.

Onodera has advocated for the installation of the Aegis Ashore missile defense system in Japan, travelling to proposed installation sites in Akita Prefecture and Yamaguchi Prefecture to win local consent.

Onodera was Chairman of the LDP Policy Research Council under Shigeru Ishiba from September 2024 to October 2025. At the time there were two rival policy bodies on fiscal policy in the LDP: one for fiscal consolidation and one for expansionary fiscal policy. In April 2025, these were merged into a Fiscal Reform Headquarters (財政改革検討本部) with Onodera as its head.

Onodera left these positions when Sanae Takaichi took office and was appointed chairman of the LDP research commission on the Tax System.

== Personal life ==
Onodera is married and has two children.

House of Representatives (Japan)
| Preceded by Fukujiro Kikuchi | Representative for Miyagi 6th district 1997–2000 | Succeeded by Masamitsu Oishi |
| Preceded by Masamitsu Oishi | Representative for Miyagi 6th district 2003–present | Succeeded by Incumbent |
| Preceded by Hirokazu Matsuno | Chairman of the Board of Intelligence Oversight and Review; 2021–2023 | Succeeded by Yasukazu Hamada |
| Preceded by Takumi Nemoto | Chairman of the Budget Committee; 2023–2024 | Succeeded by Tatsuya Ito |
Political offices
| Preceded by Satoshi Morimoto | Minister of Defence; 2012–2014 | Succeeded by Akinori Eto |
| Preceded by Fumio Kishida; Acting | Minister of Defence; 2017–2018 | Succeeded by Takeshi Iwaya |
Party political offices
| Preceded by Taimei Yamaguchi | Chief of the Organisation and Movement Headquarters, Liberal Democratic Party; 2020–2021 | Succeeded by Yuko Obuchi |
| Preceded by Kisaburo Tokai | Chairman of the Policy Research Council, Liberal Democratic Party; 2024–2025 | Succeeded by Takayuki Kobayashi |
| Preceded by Yoichi Miyazawa | Chairman of the Tax Research Commission, Liberal Democratic Party; 2025–present | Incumbent |
