= Motoyoshi Station =

Former railway station in Kesennuma, Miyagi Prefecture, Japan

Motoyoshi 本吉
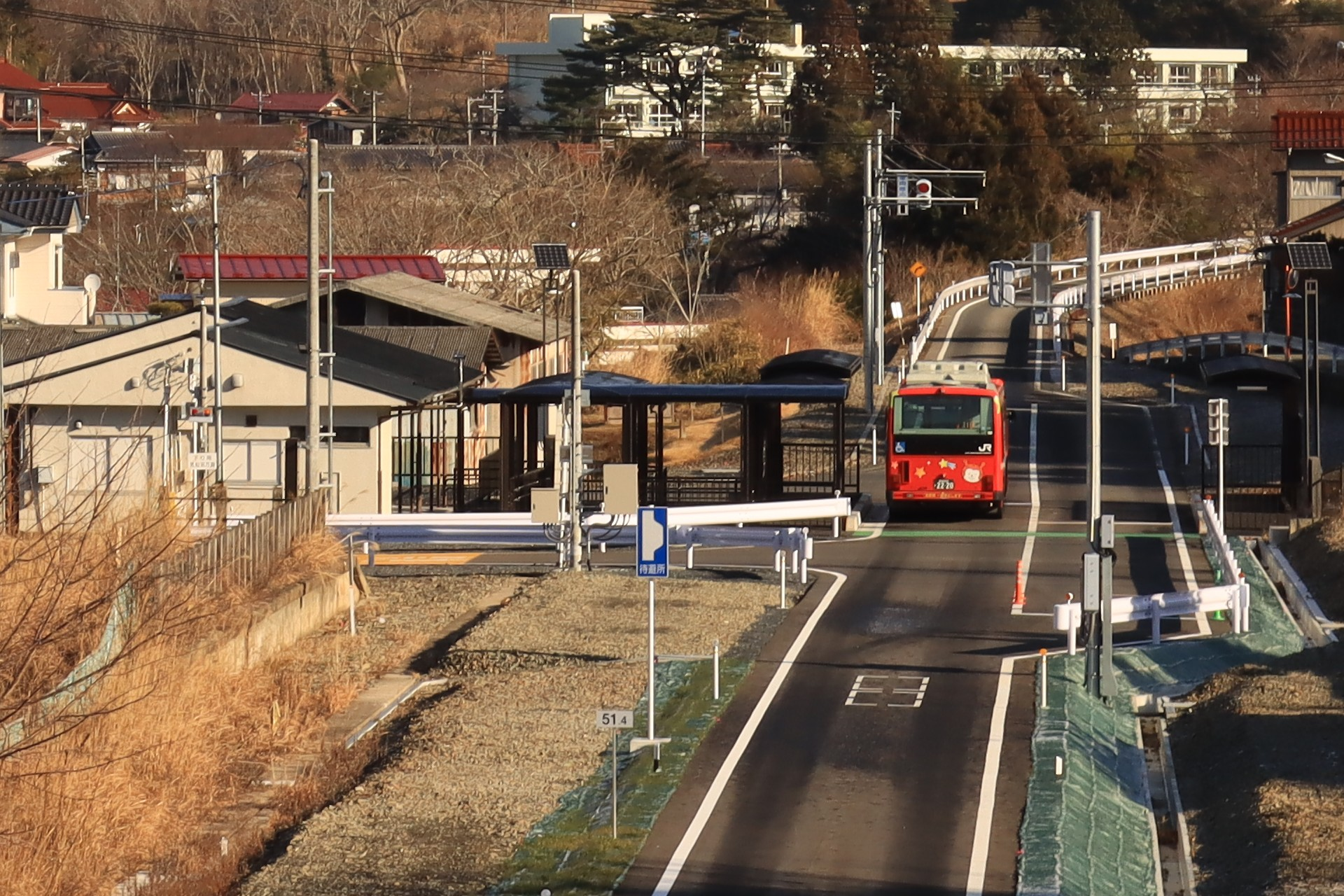
- BRT Motoyoshi Station in December 2019

General information
- Location: Tsuya-Matsuo, Motoyoshida-cho, Kesennuma, Miyagi （宮城県気仙沼市本吉町津谷松尾） Japan
- Coordinates: 38°47′10″N 141°30′07″E
- Operator: JR East
- Line: ■ Kesennuma Line
- Platforms: 1 side platform
- Connections: Bus stop

History
- Opened: 11 February 1957
- Closed: 11 March 2011

Services
| Preceding station | JR East | Following station |
|---|---|---|
| Rikuzen-Koizumi towards Maeyachi | Kesennuma / Ōfunato BRT | Koganezawa towards Sakari |
Location
- Location within Japan

Motoyoshi Station (本吉駅, Motoyoshi-eki) was a railway station in the city of Kesennuma, Miyagi, Japan, operated by East Japan Railway Company (JR East) until 2011. The station became a stop on the replacement bus rapid transit (BRT) line following the March 2011 Tōhoku earthquake and tsunami.

== Lines ==
Motoyoshi Station was served by the Kesennuma Line, and was located 51.5 rail kilometers from the terminus of the line at Maeyachi Station.

== Station layout ==
The station had a single island platform connected to the station building by a footbridge. The station was unattended.

== History ==
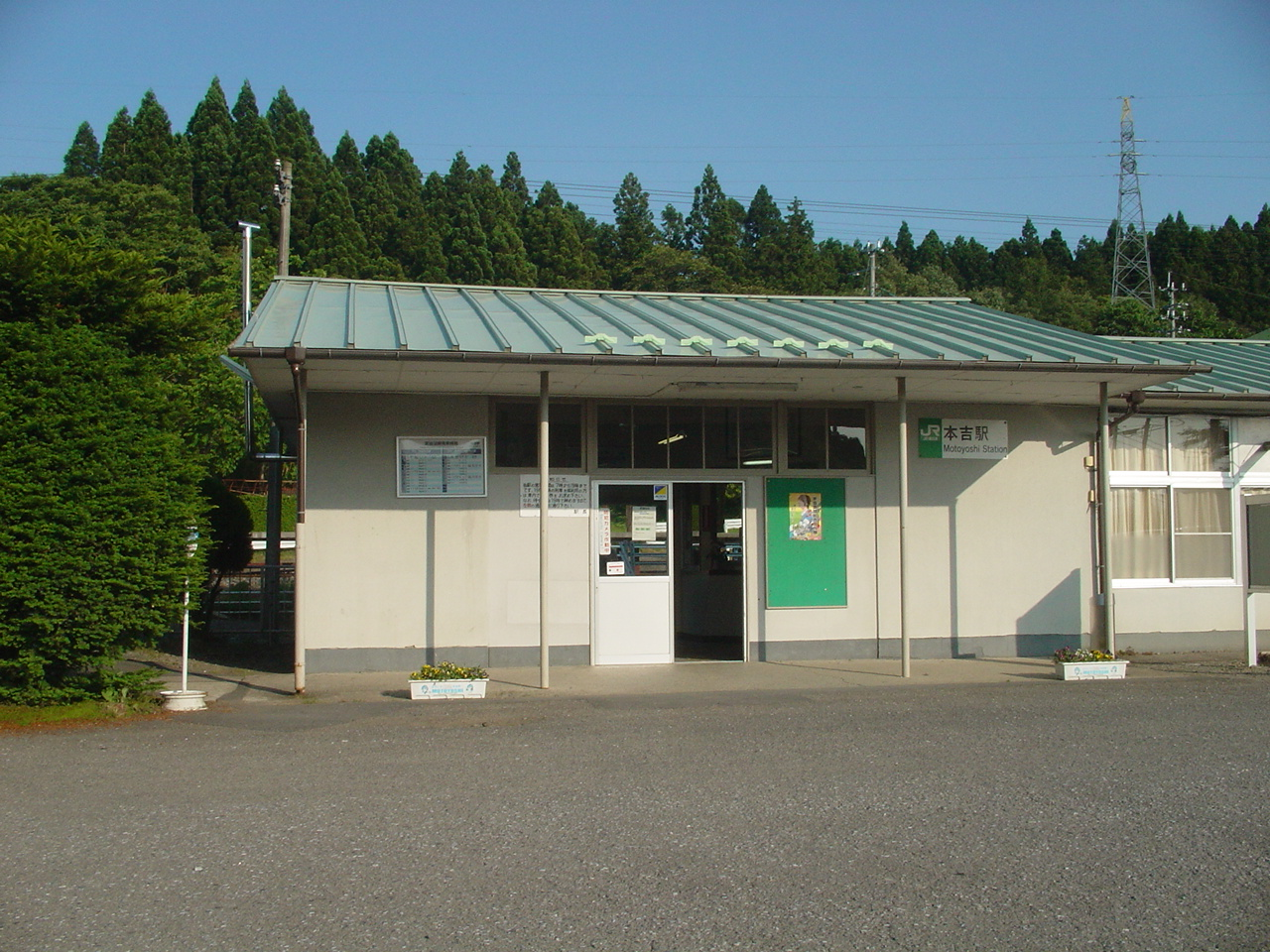
Motoyoshi Station in June 2007

Motoyoshi Station opened on 11 February 1957. The station was absorbed into the JR East network upon the privatization of the Japanese National Railways (JNR) on 1 April 1987. The station itself was only slightly damaged by 2011 Tōhoku earthquake and tsunami, however, rail services on the line were subsequently replaced by a bus rapid transit (BRT) line.

== Surrounding area ==
- National Route 45
- National Route 45
- National Health Insurance Hospital
- Kesennuma City East Branch Office
