= Kesennuma =

Kesennuma 気仙沼市
- City
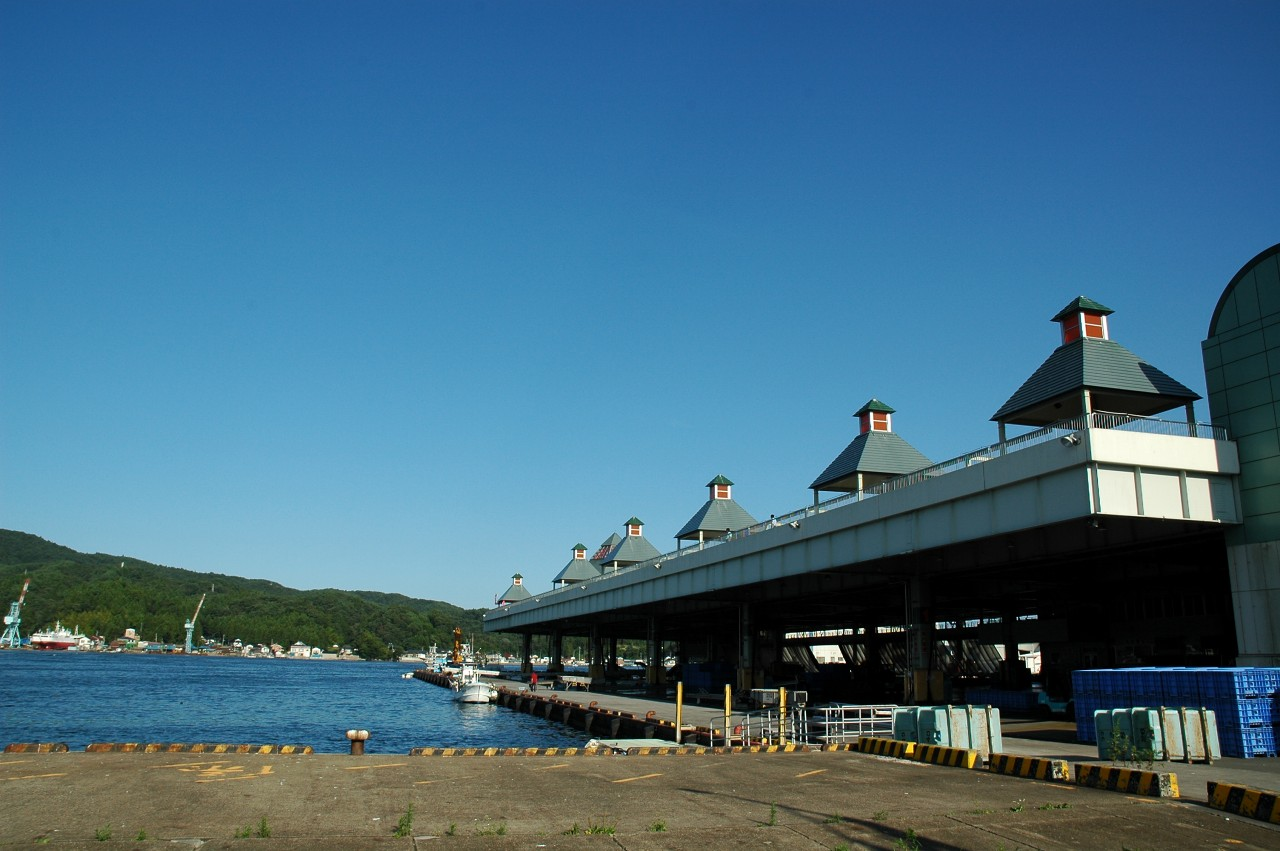
- Kesennuma Fishing Port

- Flag Seal

- Location of Kesennuma in Miyagi Prefecture

- Coordinates: 38°54′29″N 141°34′11.8″E
- Country: Japan
- Region: Tōhoku
- Prefecture: Miyagi

Government
  - Mayor: Noboru Suzuki

Area
  - Total: 332.44 km^{2} (128.36 sq mi)

Population (July 1, 2022)
  - Total: 58,982
  - Density: 177.42/km^{2} (459.52/sq mi)
- Time zone: UTC+9 (Japan Standard Time)
- Phone number: 0226-22-6600
- Address: 1-1-1 Yōka-machi, Kesennuma-shi 988-8501
- Climate: Cfa
- Website: Official website
- Symbols
- Bird: Seagull
- Fish: Bonito
- Flower: Azalea
- Tree: Japanese Black Pine

Kesennuma (気仙沼市, Kesennuma-shi) is a city in Miyagi Prefecture, Japan. As of 1 August 2020, the city had an estimated population of 59,803 and a population density of 190 inhabitants per square kilometre (490/sq mi) in 26,390 households. The total area of the city is 332.44 square kilometres (128.36 sq mi). Large sections of the city were destroyed by the 2011 Tōhoku earthquake and tsunami and major fires on March 11, 2011.

== Geography ==
Kesennuma is in the far northeastern corner of Miyagi Prefecture. The city wraps around the western part of Kesennuma Bay and also includes the island of Ōshima. Its deeply indented rias coastline forms the southern boundary of the Sanriku Fukkō National Park, which stretches north to Aomori Prefecture.

The city borders Hirota Bay, Kesennuma Bay, and the Pacific Ocean to the east and Minamisanriku, Miyagi to the south. Iwate Prefecture makes up the remainder of its borders, with the city of Ichinoseki to the west, and the city of Rikuzentakata to the north. The highest point in Kesennuma is the 711.9 metres (2,336 ft) high Mount Ōmori, on the border with Motoyoshi, while the lowest point is at sea level. The Ō River flows through the city and into Kesennuma Bay.

=== Neighboring municipalities ===
Iwate Prefecture

- Ichinoseki
- Rikuzentakada

Miyagi Prefecture

- Minamisanriku
- Tome

=== Climate ===
Average temperature and precipitation in Kesennuma.

Kesennuma has a humid subtropical climate (Köppen climate classification Cfa) characterized by mild summers and cold winters. The average annual temperature in Kesennuma is 11.2 °C (52.2 °F). The average annual rainfall is 1,375.8 mm (54.17 in) with September as the wettest month. The temperatures are highest on average in August, at around 22.9 °C (73.2 °F), and lowest in January, at around 0.3 °C (32.5 °F). Its record high is 36.0 °C (96.8 °F), reached on 15 August 1994, and its record low is −12.6 °C (9.3 °F), reached on 17 February 1980.

Climate data for Kesennuma (elevation 62 m, 1991–2020 normals, extremes 1976–present)
Month	Jan	Feb	Mar	Apr	May	Jun	Jul	Aug	Sep	Oct	Nov	Dec	Year
Record high °C (°F)	15.7 (60.3)	19.2 (66.6)	23.5 (74.3)	30.8 (87.4)	34.0 (93.2)	34.1 (93.4)	36.7 (98.1)	36.6 (97.9)	36.3 (97.3)	29.2 (84.6)	24.3 (75.7)	20.5 (68.9)	36.7 (98.1)
Mean daily maximum °C (°F)	4.4 (39.9)	5.2 (41.4)	8.9 (48.0)	14.4 (57.9)	19.0 (66.2)	22.0 (71.6)	25.4 (77.7)	27.2 (81.0)	24.1 (75.4)	18.9 (66.0)	13.1 (55.6)	6.9 (44.4)	15.8 (60.4)
Daily mean °C (°F)	0.3 (32.5)	0.7 (33.3)	3.9 (39.0)	8.9 (48.0)	13.8 (56.8)	17.6 (63.7)	21.3 (70.3)	22.9 (73.2)	19.7 (67.5)	14.0 (57.2)	8.0 (46.4)	2.7 (36.9)	11.2 (52.2)
Mean daily minimum °C (°F)	−3.2 (26.2)	−3.1 (26.4)	−0.6 (30.9)	3.9 (39.0)	9.2 (48.6)	13.9 (57.0)	18.3 (64.9)	19.7 (67.5)	16.1 (61.0)	9.7 (49.5)	3.4 (38.1)	−0.9 (30.4)	7.2 (45.0)
Record low °C (°F)	−12.5 (9.5)	−12.6 (9.3)	−9.8 (14.4)	−4.1 (24.6)	0.0 (32.0)	4.1 (39.4)	9.9 (49.8)	11.7 (53.1)	5.7 (42.3)	−0.3 (31.5)	−4.0 (24.8)	−10.1 (13.8)	−12.6 (9.3)
Average precipitation mm (inches)	44.2 (1.74)	38.7 (1.52)	94.5 (3.72)	106.6 (4.20)	128.2 (5.05)	153.7 (6.05)	193.7 (7.63)	149.7 (5.89)	184.3 (7.26)	148.7 (5.85)	74.3 (2.93)	51.6 (2.03)	1,368.2 (53.87)
Average precipitation days (≥ 1.0 mm)	6.4	6.1	8.6	8.7	10.3	10.6	13.6	11.8	11.8	9.6	7.5	7.3	112.7
Mean monthly sunshine hours	168.5	162.5	187.1	199.3	197.4	159.5	145.1	162.1	138.6	155.7	158.9	152.5	1,987.2
Source: Japan Meteorological Agency (1991–2020 normals, extremes 1976–present)

== Demographics ==
Per Japanese census data, the population of Kesennuma has declined over the past 40 years.

Historical population
Year	Pop.	±%
1920	43,824	—
1930	55,209	+26.0%
1940	63,653	+15.3%
1950	76,391	+20.0%
1960	84,110	+10.1%
1970	87,914	+4.5%
1980	92,246	+4.9%
1990	88,152	−4.4%
2000	82,394	−6.5%
2010	73,489	−10.8%
2020	61,147	−16.8%

== History ==
The area of present-day Kesennuma was part of ancient Mutsu Province and has been settled since at least the Jōmon period by the Emishi people, as evidenced by numerous shell middens found in coastal areas. During the later portion of the Heian period, the area was ruled by the Northern Fujiwara. During the Sengoku period, the area was contested by various samurai clans before the area came under the control of the Date clan of Sendai Domain during the Edo period, under the Tokugawa shogunate. The town of Kesennuma was established on June 1, 1889 within Motoyoshi District, Miyagi with the establishment of the modern municipalities system.

Kesennuma City was formed on June 1, 1953, when the town of Kesennuma annexed the neighboring town of Shishiori and village of Matsuiwa. On April 1, 1955, the city annexed the villages of Niitsuki, Hashikami and Oshima. On March 31, 2006, the town of Karakuwa and on September 1, 2009 the town of Motoyoshi (both from Motoyoshi District) were likewise incorporated into Kesennuma.

On March 11, 2011, large parts of the city were destroyed by the tsunami which followed the Tōhoku earthquake. The island of Ōshima and its 3,000 residents, included in the city limits, was isolated by the tsunami which damaged the ferry connections. After the tsunami, spilled fuel from the town's fishing fleet caught fire and burned for four days. As of 22 April 2011, the city had confirmed 837 deaths with 1,196 missing.

In August 2013, residents decided to scrap a fishing boat - the Kyotoku Maru No 18 - which was swept inland by a giant wave during the 2011 tsunami. There had been plans to preserve the boat as a monument, as it had become a symbol of the tsunami.

In 2014, Kesennuma was designated as Japan's first "slow town".

== Government ==
Kesennuma has a mayor-council form of government with a directly elected mayor and a unicameral city legislature of 24 members. Kessenuma, together with Motoyoshi District contributes three seats to the Miyagi Prefectural legislature. In terms of national politics, after the abolishment of the Miyagi 6th district in 2022, the city is part of Miyagi 5th district of the lower house of the Diet of Japan.

== Economy ==
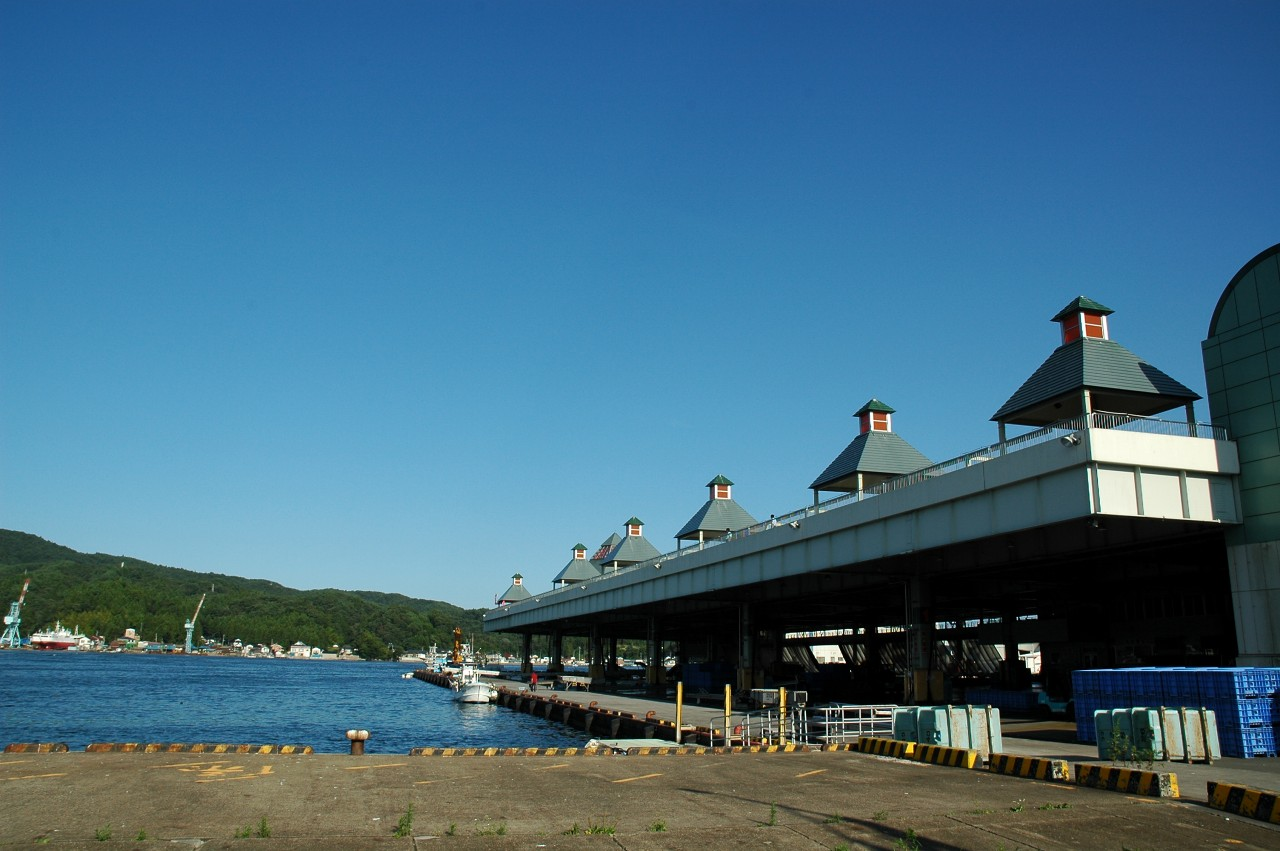
Kesennuma Fishing Port in 2006

Kesennuma relies on tourism and commercial fishing, the latter being what the city is known for, especially its shark, tuna, pacific saury and skipjack tuna production, keeping the fishing port very active. Prior to the 2011 disaster, the city was Japan's busiest port for processing bonito and swordfish. Presently, fishing and associated industries account for 85% of jobs in the town.

== Education ==
Kesennuma has 14 public elementary schools and eight junior high schools operated by the town government, and four public high schools operated by the Miyagi Prefectural Board of Education and one private high school. The prefectural government also operates one special educational school.

== Transportation ==
=== Railway ===
East Japan Railway Company (JR East) - Ōfunato Line

- Kesennuma

=== Bus ===
East Japan Railway Company (JR East) - Kesennuma Line BRT and Ōfunato Line BRT (BRT system)

- Kurauchi - Rikuzen-Koizumi - Motoyoshi - Koganezawa - Ōyakaigan - Ōyamachi - Rikuzen-Hashikami - Saichi - Iwatsuki - Matsuiwa - Akaiwaminato/Kesennuma City Hospital Minami-Kesennuma - Fudōnosawa - Kesennuma - Naiwan-Iriguchi (Yōkamachi)- Shishiorikarakuwa - Kami-Shishiori - Hachiman-Ōhashi (Tōryō High School) - Karakuwaōsawa|x

=== Highway ===
National Route 45

National Route 284

National Route 346

== Sister cities ==
=== International ===
- Puntarenas, Costa Rica
- Zhoushan, Zhejiang Province, China
- Changyi District, Jilin, China

=== Japanese sister cities ===
- (Japan) Ichinoseki, Iwate
- (Japan) Meguro, Tokyo

== Notable people from Kesennuma ==
- Isshin Chiba, voice actor
- Satoru Kanemura, professional baseball player
- Tetsuo Kanno, politician
- Shinji Maggy, comedian and magician
- Itsunori Onodera, politician
- Rikako Sasaki, idol singer
