= Rikuzen-Koizumi Station =

Former railway station in Kesennuma, Miyagi Prefecture, Japan

Rikuzen-Koizumi Station 陸前小泉駅
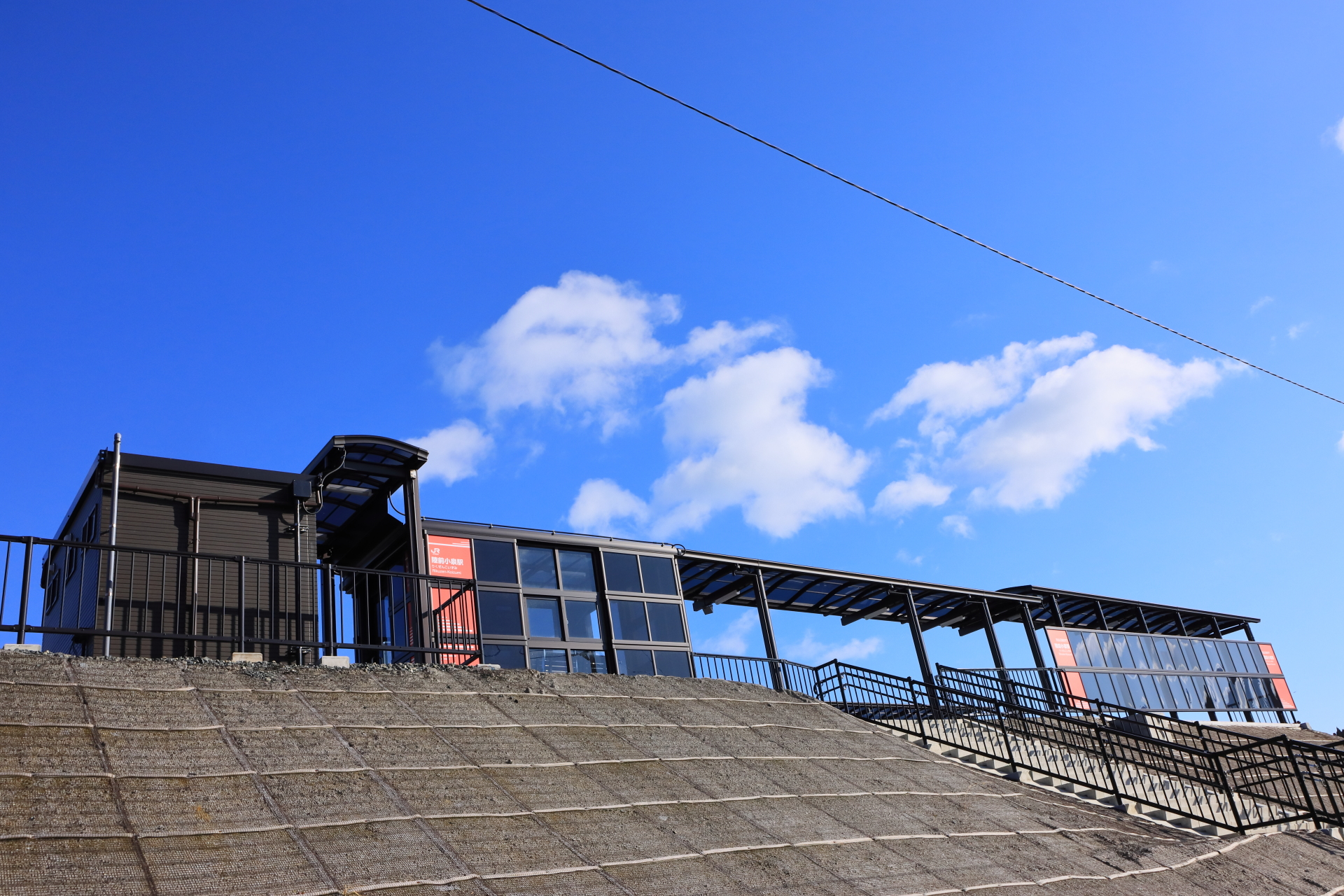
- Rikuzen-Koizumi Station in January 2020

General information
- Location: Motoyoshida-cho Shimojuku 38, Kesennuma, Miyagi （宮城県気仙沼市本吉町下宿38） Japan
- Coordinates: 38°46′01″N 141°30′33″E
- Operator: JR East
- Line: ■ Kesennuma Line
- Platforms: 1 side platform

History
- Opened: 11 December 1977
- Closed: 11 March 2011

Services
Preceding station	JR East	Following station
Kurauchi towards Maeyachi	Kesennuma / Ōfunato BRT	Motoyoshi towards Sakari
Location
- Location within Japan

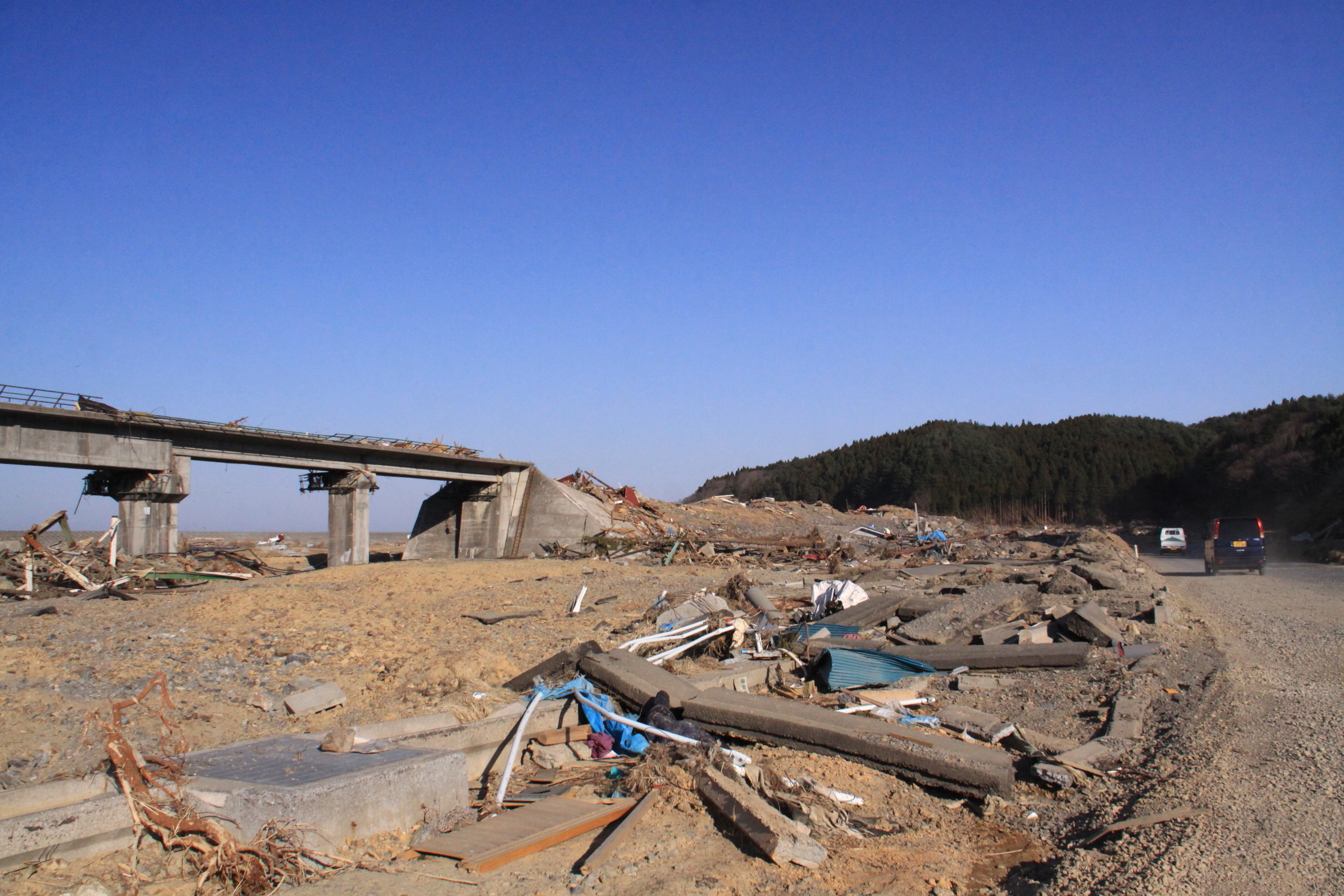
Rikuzen-Koizumi Station after the 2011 earthquake and tsunami

Rikuzen-Koizumi Station (陸前小泉駅, Rikuzen-Koizumi-eki) was a JR East railway station located in the city of Kesennuma, Miyagi Prefecture, Japan. The station was completely destroyed by the 2011 Tōhoku earthquake and tsunami and services have now been replaced by a provisional bus rapid transit line.

== Lines ==
Rikuzen-Koizumi Station was served by the Kesennuma Line, and was located 48.7 rail kilometers from the terminus of the line at Maeyachi Station.

== Station layout ==
Rikuzen-Koizumi Station had one side platform serving a single bi-directional track. The station was unattended.

== History ==
Rikuzen-Koizumi Station opened on 11 December 1977. The station was absorbed into the JR East network upon the privatization of the Japan National Railways (JNR) on April 1, 1987. The station was completely destroyed by 2011 Tōhoku earthquake and tsunami, and rail services have now been replaced by a bus rapid transit line.

== Surrounding area ==
- Japan National Route 45
- Koizumi Ocean Bathing Area
- Rikuzen-Koizumi Post Office
