= Ōyakaigan Station =

Former railway station in Kesennuma, Miyagi Prefecture, Japan

Ōyakaigan Station 大谷海岸駅
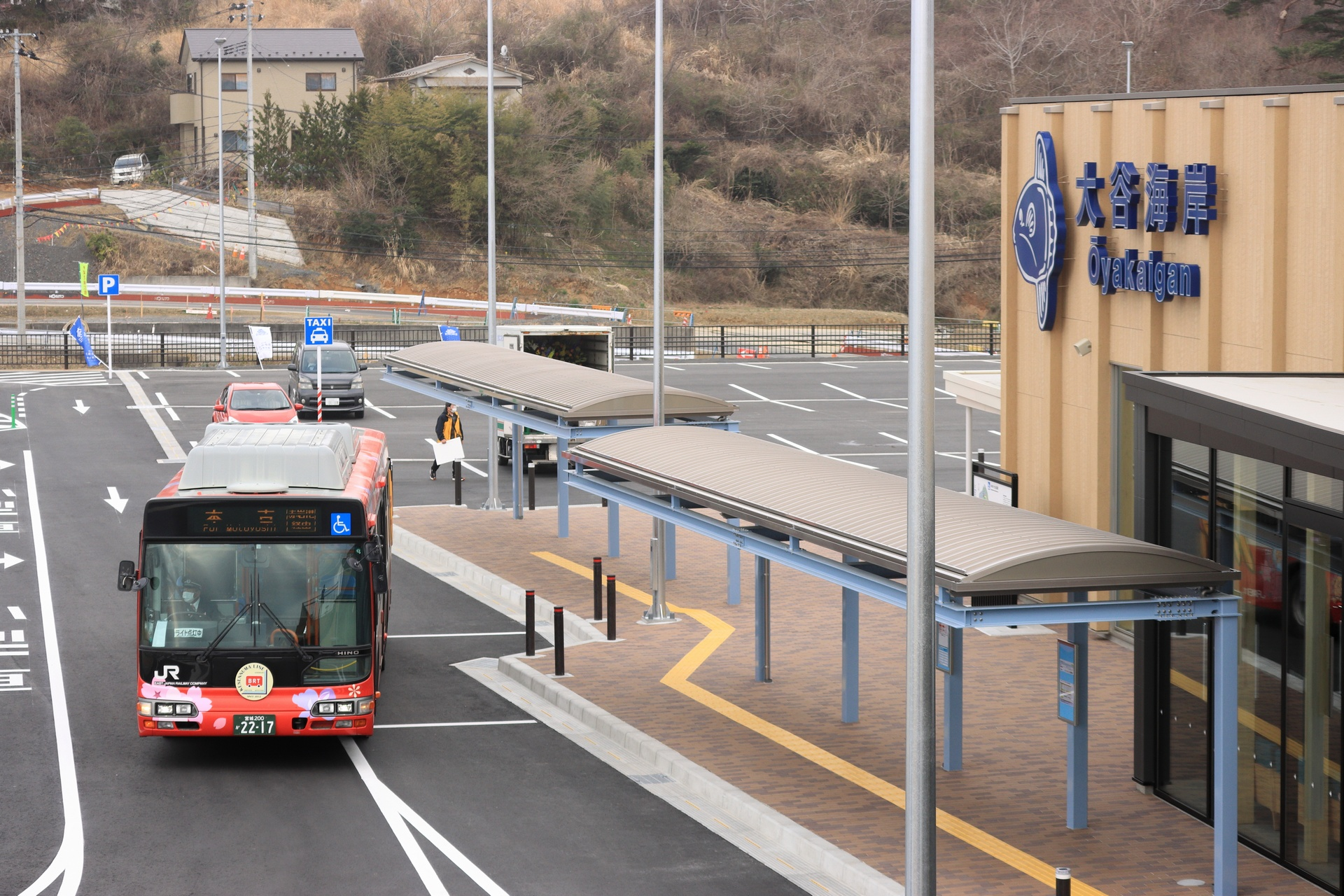
- Ōyakaigan Station in March 2021

General information
- Location: Motoyoshida-cho Mishima 94-12, Kesennuma, Miyagi （宮城県気仙沼市本吉町三島94-12） Japan
- Coordinates: 38°48′50″N 141°34′02″E
- Operator: JR East
- Line: ■ Kesennuma Line
- Distance: 58.3 km from Maeyachi
- Platforms: 1 side platform

History
- Opened: 11 February 1957
- Closed: 11 March 2011
- Former names: Ōya (to 1997)

Services
Preceding station	JR East	Following station
Koganezawa towards Maeyachi	Kesennuma / Ōfunato BRT	Oyamachi towards Sakari

Former services
Preceding station	JR East	Following station
Koganezawa towards Kogota	Kesennuma Line	Rikuzen-Hashikami towards Kesennuma
Location
- Location within Japan

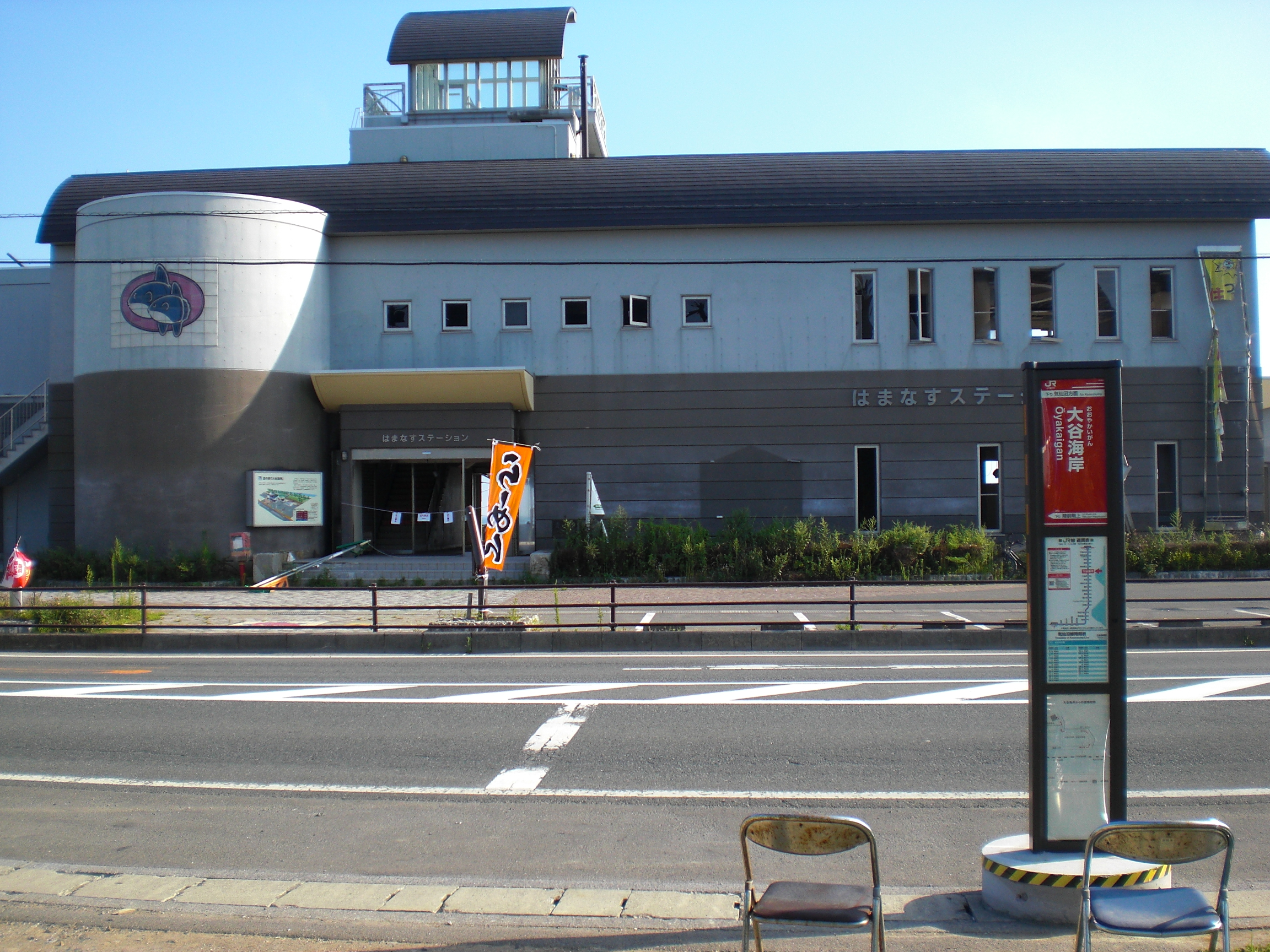
BRT bus stop in August 2012

Ōyakaigan Station (大谷海岸駅, Ōyakaigan-eki) was a JR East railway station located in the city of Kesennuma, Miyagi Prefecture, Japan. The station was damaged by the 2011 Tōhoku earthquake and tsunami; however services have now been replaced by a provisional bus rapid transit line.

== Lines ==
Ōyakaigan Station was served by the Kesennuma Line, and was located 58.3 rail kilometers from the terminus of the line at Maeyachi Station.

== Station layout ==
Ōyakaigan Station had one side platform serving a single bi-directional track. The station was unattended.

== History ==
Ōyakaigan Station opened on 11 February 1957 as Ōya Station (大谷駅, Ōya-eki). The station was absorbed into the JR East network upon the privatization of the Japan National Railways (JNR) on April 1, 1987. The station changed its name to its present name on 22 March 1997. The 2011 Tōhoku earthquake and tsunami severely damaged he station and nearby tracks, and rail services have now been replaced by a bus rapid transit line.

The station building was later demolished and the Otani Road Station has been established in its place.

== Surrounding area ==
- Japan National Route 45
- Ōya Beach
- Ōya Post Office
