= Matsushita Institute of Government and Management =

Institute of politics in Chigasaki, Japan

- 松下政経塾; Matsushita seikei juku
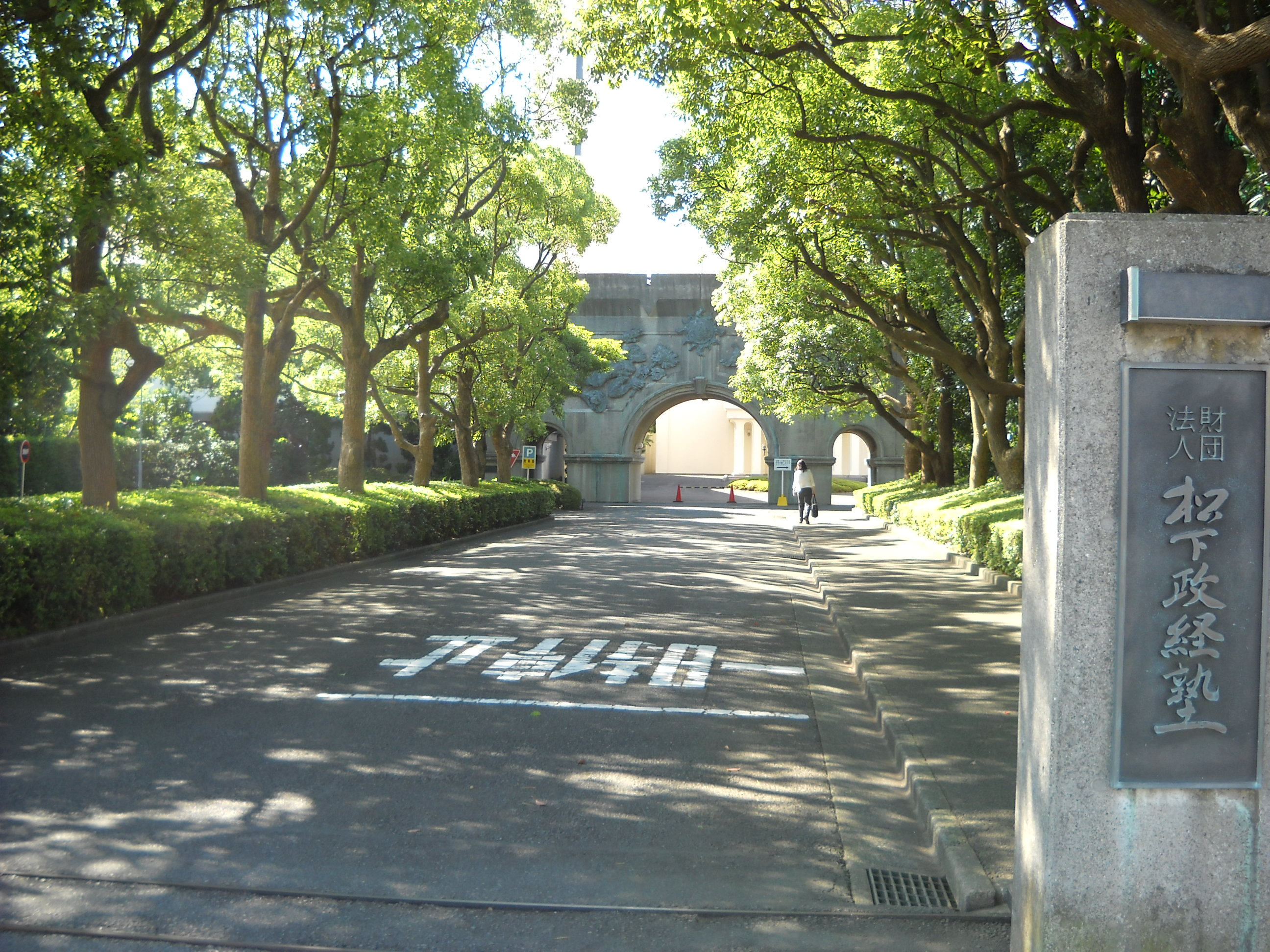
- Chigasaki campus entrance
- Established: 21 June 1979; 46 years ago
- Founder: Kōnosuke Matsushita
- Headquarters: 5-25 Shiomidai
- Location(s): Chigasaki Kanagawa Prefecture, Japan
- Parent organization: Konosuke Matsushita Memorial Foundation
- Students: 17 (2025)
- Website: https://www.mskj.or.jp/

The Matsushita Institute of Government and Management (MIGM) is a Japanese private educational institution that trains young people in politics. Established by Panasonic founder Kōnosuke Matsushita in 1979, it counts many Japanese politicians and business leaders among its graduates. It offers a multi-year postgraduate course to students chosen in a rigorous admission process; tuition is paid for by the institute. Notable alumni include Japanese prime ministers Yoshihiko Noda and Sanae Takaichi.

== Overview ==
The institute was established by Panasonic founder Kōnosuke Matsushita in 1979. Located at Chigasaki in Kanagawa Prefecture, it promotes Matsushita's ideas; its basic principle is "deep love" of Japan and its people. Its educational programme includes leadership training, public speaking, internships, foreign languages, work on a factory assembly line, and meditation and the martial arts. Funded by an endowment from Matsushita's personal capital, the institute was intended to cultivate young leaders to guide Japan into the twenty-first century. The institute is unique both in Japan and worldwide because of its focus on training young people to win elections; it serves as an incubator for future politicians. Admission is competitive: only 6–10 students between the ages of 22–35 are accepted each year. Candidates are evaluated on their leadership potential. Only those who express clear life goals are accepted.

Upon matriculation, all fees incurred by the multi-year postgraduate course are paid for by the institute. The course's duration has varied over the years. Originally, it was five years long, but this was reduced to four years in 1996, then three years in 1997. Since 2011, it has been four years. Graduates receive no formal degree or support in the job-hunting process. They are usually first-generation politicians from modest backgrounds, which stands in contrast to the traditional dominance of political families in Japan.

The institute's influence on Japanese politics has been extensive; by 2006, 66 of its 213 graduates had attained elected office, including 28 members of the House of Representatives, 2 prefectural governors, and 6 mayors. Graduates were instrumental in the success of the Japan New Party, which contributed to the governing Liberal Democratic Party's fall into opposition in 1993. The institute itself is politically neutral, and graduates are free to join the political party of their choosing. Some graduates also find work in the media, education, and business sectors.

== Alumni ==
Notable graduates include former Democratic Party of Japan prime minister Yoshihiko Noda, Liberal Democratic Party prime minister Sanae Takaichi, Itsunori Onodera, Seiji Maehara and Yoshihiro Murai.
