= Kurauchi Station =

Former railway station in Kesennuma, Miyagi Prefecture, Japan

Kurauchi Station 蔵内駅
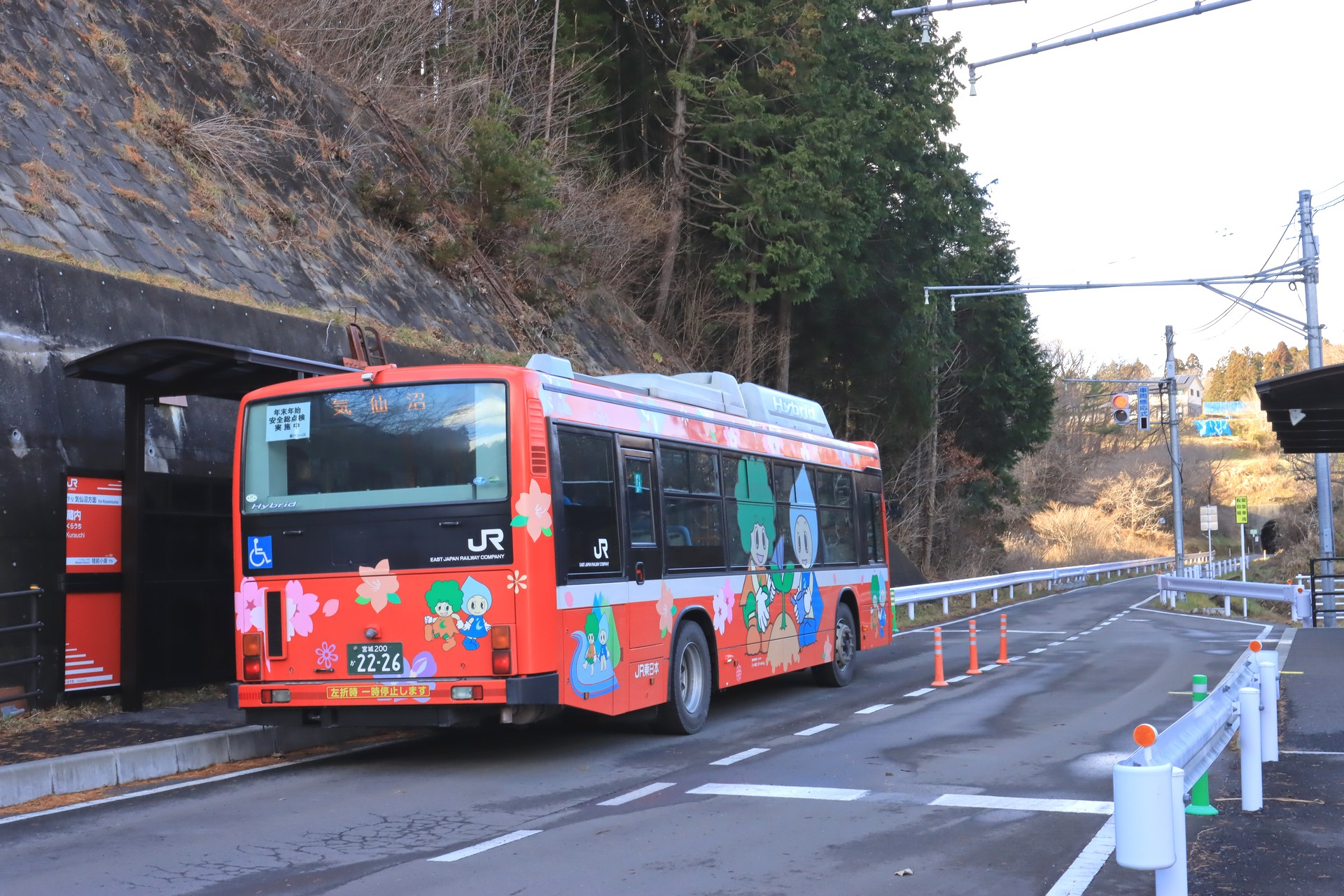
- Kurauchi Station in December 2019

General information
- Location: Motoyoshida-cho Uto 116, Kesennuma, Miyagi （宮城県気仙沼市本吉町歌生116） Japan
- Coordinates: 38°45′14″N 141°31′28″E
- Operator: JR East
- Line: ■ Kesennuma Line
- Platforms: 1 side platform

History
- Opened: 11 December 1977
- Closed: 11 March 2011

Services
Preceding station	JR East	Following station
Rikuzen-Minato towards Maeyachi	Kesennuma / Ōfunato BRT	Rikuzen-Koizumi towards Sakari
Location
- Location within Japan

Kurauchi Station (蔵内駅, Kurauchi-eki) was a JR East railway station located in the city of Kesennuma, Miyagi Prefecture, Japan. Services have now been replaced by a provisional bus rapid transit line.

== Lines ==
Kurauchi Station was served by the Kesennuma Line, and was located 46.7 rail kilometers from the terminus of the line at Maeyachi Station.

== Station layout ==
Kurauchi Station had one side platform serving a single bi-directional track. The station was unattended.

== History ==
Rikuzen-Koizumi Station opened on 11 December 1977. The station was absorbed into the JR East network upon the privatization of the Japan National Railways (JNR) on April 1, 1987. Operations were discontinued after the 2011 Tōhoku earthquake and tsunami, and rail services have now been replaced by a bus rapid transit line.

== Surrounding area ==
- Japan National Route 45
