= Motoyoshi (name) =

- Gender: Male

Origin
- Origin: Japanese
- Meaning: Different meanings depending on the kanji used

Motoyoshi (written: 基義, 基吉 or 元良) is a masculine Japanese given name. Notable people with the name include:

- Prince Motoyoshi (元良親王; 890–943), Japanese poet and nobleman
- Motoyoshi Oda (小田 基義; 1910–1973), Japanese film director
- Motoyoshi Shimizu (清水 基吉; 1918–2008), pen name of Shimizu Motoyoshi, Japanese writer and poet

Motoyoshi (written: 本吉) is also a Japanese surname. Notable people with the surname include:

- Takeshi Motoyoshi (本吉 剛; born 1967), Japanese footballer
