= Tome District, Miyagi =

District of Miyagi, Japan

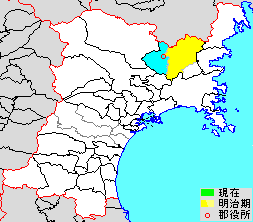
Map showing the location of Tome County within the prefecture (before it was dissolved).

- List of Provinces of Japan > Tōsandō > Rikuzen Province > Tome District
- Japan > Tōhoku region > Miyagi Prefecture > Tome District

Tome District (登米郡, Tome-gun) was a district located in northeastern Miyagi Prefecture, Japan. It was dissolved in 2005 when forming the city of Tome.

As of 2000, the district estimated population of 89,389 and a density is 191 persons per km^{2}. The total area was 467.98 km^{2}.

== Former towns and villages ==
The towns and villages formerly in the district, before amalgamation of Tome, including part of Motoyoshi District.

- Hasama
- Ishikoshi
- Minamikata
- Nakada
- Toyoma
- Towa
- Toyosato

== Mergers ==
On April 1, 2005 - the towns of Hasama, Ishikoshi, Minamikata, Nakada, Toyoma, Towa, Toyosato and Yoneyama merged with the town of Tsuyama (from Motoyoshi District), were merged to create the city of Tome. Tome District was dissolved. The new city hall is located the former town of Hasama.
