= Koganezawa Station =

Former railway station in Kesennuma, Miyagi Prefecture, Japan

Koganezawa Station 小金沢駅
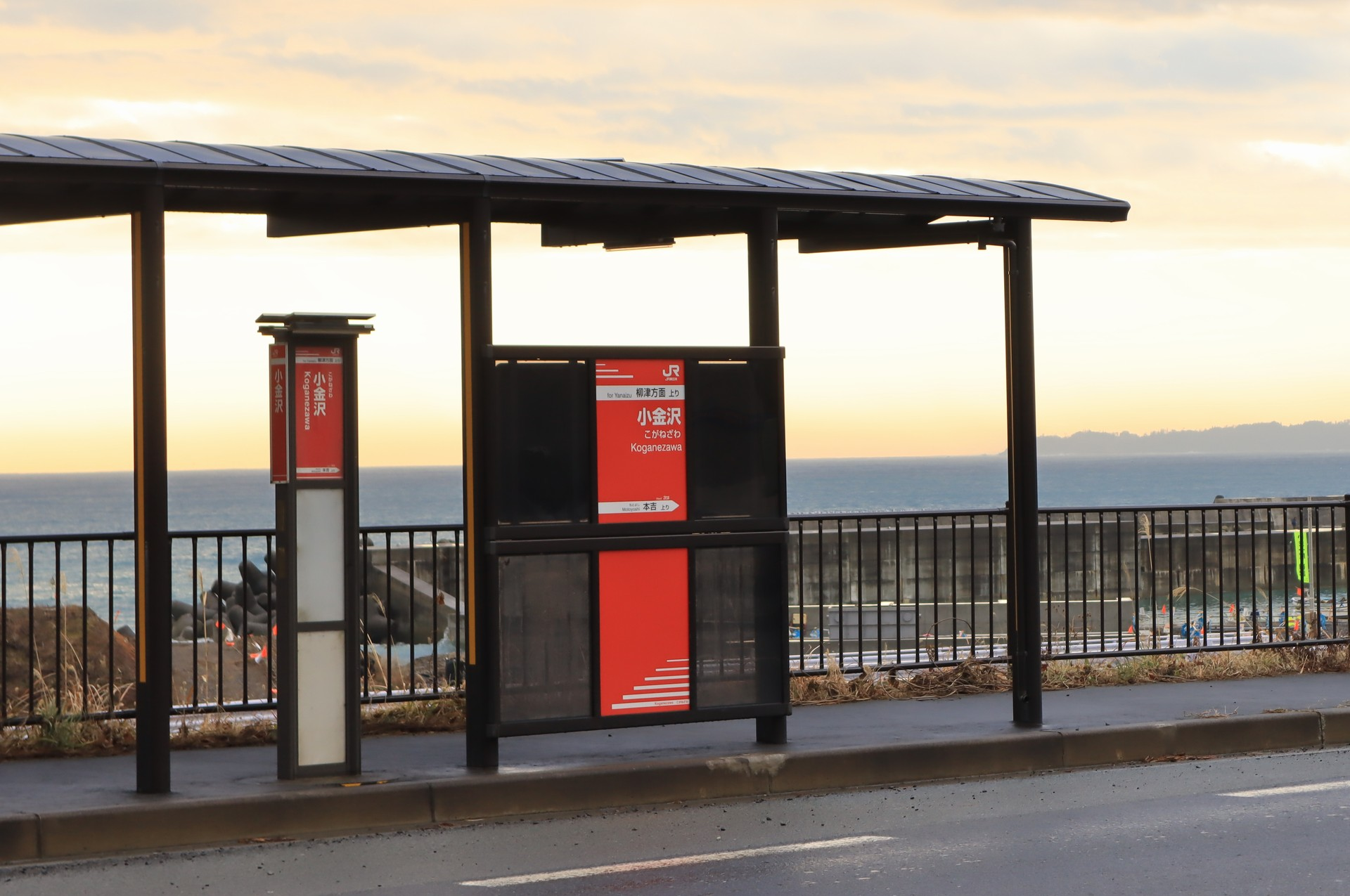
- Koganezawa Station in December 2019

General information
- Location: Motoyoshida-cho Koganezawa, Kesennuma, Miyagi （宮城県気仙沼市本吉町小金沢） Japan
- Coordinates: 38°47′45″N 141°32′06″E
- Operator: JR East
- Line: ■ Kesennuma Line
- Distance: 54.6 km from Maeyachi
- Platforms: 1 side platform

Other information
- Status: Closed

History
- Opened: 11 February 1957
- Closed: 11 March 2011

Services
Preceding station	JR East	Following station
Motoyoshi towards Maeyachi	Kesennuma / Ōfunato BRT	Ōyakaigan towards Sakari
Location
- Location within Japan

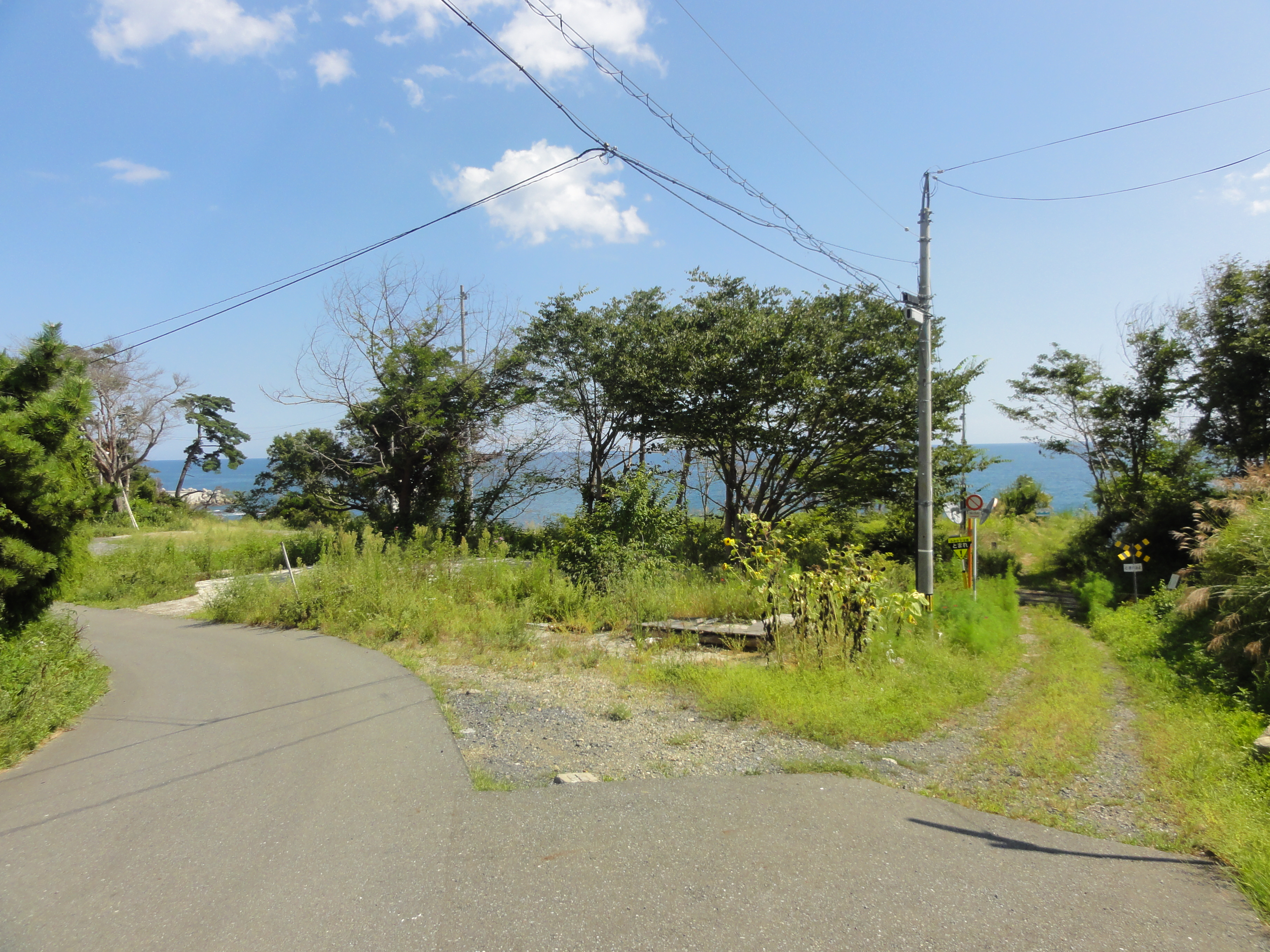
Koganezawa Station after the 2011 earthquake and tsunami

Koganezawa Station (小金沢駅, Koganezawa-eki) was a railway station on the Kesennuma Line in the city of Kesennuma, Miyagi Prefecture, Japan, operated by East Japan Railway Company (JR East). The station was completely destroyed by the 2011 Tōhoku earthquake and tsunami and services have now been replaced by a provisional bus rapid transit line.

== Lines ==
Koganezawa Station was served by the Kesennuma Line, and was located 54.6 kilometers from the terminus of the line at Maeyachi Station.

== Station layout ==
Koganezawa Station had one side platform serving a single bi-directional track. The station was unattended.

== History ==
Koganezawa Station opened on 11 February 1957. The station was absorbed into the JR East network upon the privatization of the Japan National Railways (JNR) on April 1, 1987. The station changed its name to its present name on 22 March 1997. The station was completely destroyed by 2011 Tōhoku earthquake and tsunami, and rail services have now been replaced by a bus rapid transit line.

== Surrounding area ==
- National Route 45
- Ōya Beach
- Ōya Post Office

== See also ==
- List of railway stations in Japan
