= Tetsuo Kanno =

Japanese politician

- 菅野 哲雄

Member of the House of Representatives
- In office 11 September 2005 – 21 July 2009
- Preceded by: Kiyohiro Yamamoto
- Succeeded by: Hideo Yoshiizumi
- Constituency: Tohoku PR
- In office 25 June 2000 – 10 October 2003
- Preceded by: Kenjirō Hatakeyama
- Succeeded by: Kiyohiro Yamamoto
- Constituency: Tohoku PR

Member of the Kesennuma City Council
- In office 1985–2000

Personal details
- Born: 22 October 1948 (age 78) Kesennuma, Miyagi, Japan
- Party: Social Democratic
- Other political affiliations: Socialist (1985–1996)
- Education: Ichinoseki Tech High School
- Website: sdp.or.jp/kantetu/

Tetsuo Kanno (菅野 哲雄, Kanno Tetsuo; born 22 October 1948) is a Japanese politician of the Social Democratic Party, a member of the House of Representatives in the Diet (national legislature).

== Early life ==
Kanno is a native of Kesennuma, Miyagi and a high school graduate.

He started working for Toshiba in 1968.

== Political career ==
After having served for four terms in the city assembly of Kesennuma since 1985, Kanno ran unsuccessfully for the House of Representatives in February 2000.

He ran again in June of the same year and was elected for the first time. Losing his seat in 2003, he ran unsuccessfully for the House of Councilors in the Diet in 2004.

He was re-elected to the House of Representatives in 2005.
