= Japan National Route 346 =

Road in Japan

National Route 346
- 国道346号
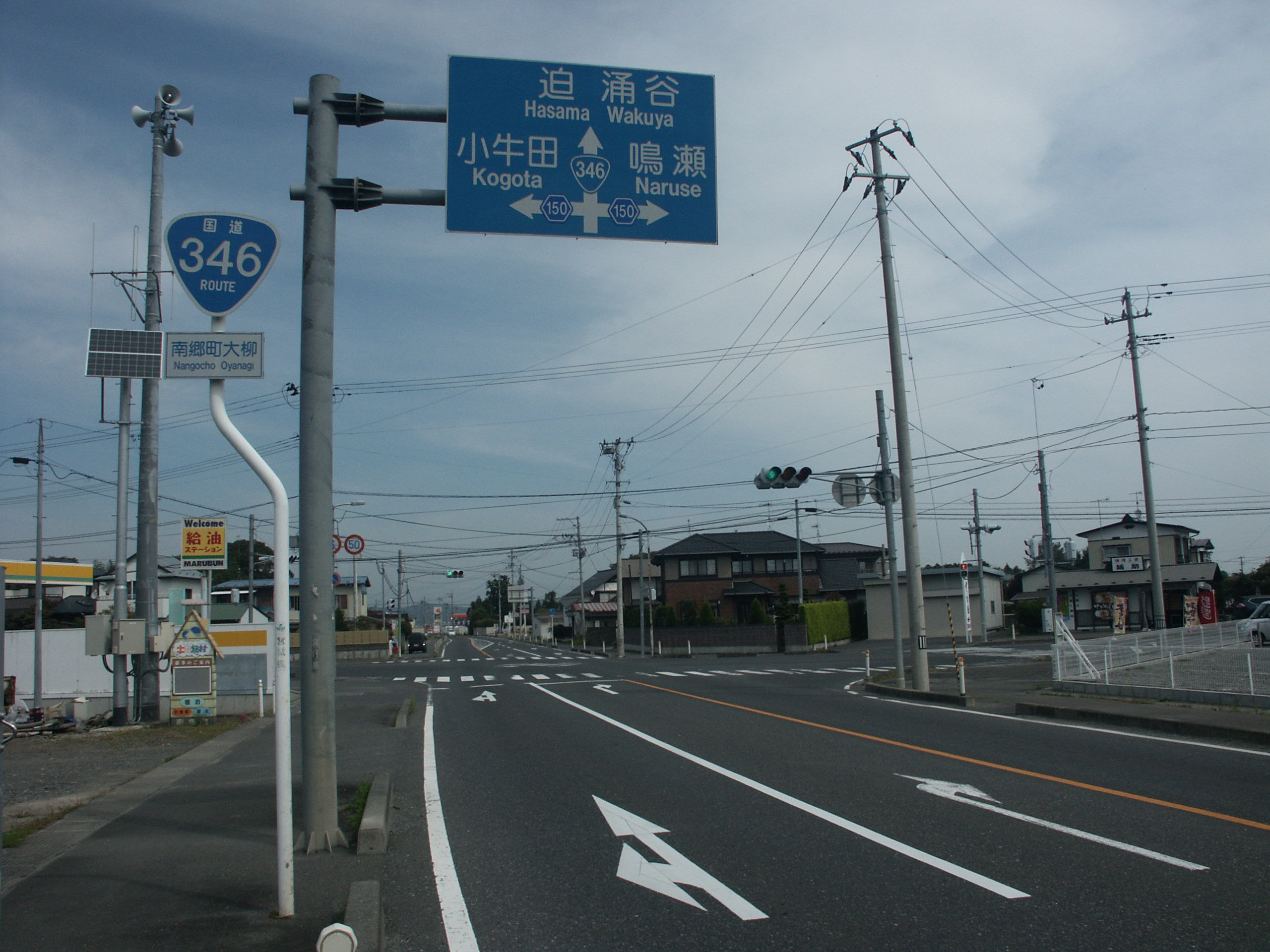

Route information
- Length: 111.6 km (69.3 mi)

Location
- Country: Japan

Highway system
- National highways of Japan; Expressways of Japan
← National Route 345	→ National Route 347

National Route 346 is a national highway of Japan connecting Aoba-ku, Sendai and Kesennuma, Miyagi in Japan, with a total length of 111.6 km (69.35 mi).
