= Motoyoshi District, Miyagi =

Rural district in Miyagi Prefecture in the Tōhoku region of Japan

Coordinates: 38.696°N 141.452°E

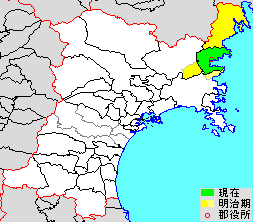
Map showing original extent of Motoyoshi District in Miyagi Prefecture colored area=original extent in Meiji period; green=present area

Motoyoshi (本吉郡, Motoyoshi-gun) is a rural district in Miyagi Prefecture, in the Tōhoku region of northern Japan.

At present, the district consists only of the town of Minamisanriku with a combined population (As of 2017) of 11,860 people, a population density of 72.6 people per km^{2} and an area of 163.4 square kilometres (63.1 sq mi). All of the city of Kesennuma and a small part of the city of Tome and part of the city of Ishinomaki were formerly part of the district.

== History ==
Under the Tokugawa shogunate, the district was within Mutsu Province and was under the control of the Date clan of Sendai Domain. In 1869, following the Meiji restoration, Mutsu Province was divided, with the area of Motoyoshi District becoming part of Rikuzen Province, and from 1872, part of Miyagi Prefecture. In the establishment of the modern municipalities system, the district was organized into one town (Kesennuma (気仙沼)) and sixteen villages (Nusazaki (麻崎村), Yokoyama (横山村), Jusanhama (十三浜村), Tokura (戸倉村), Iriya (入谷村), Motoyoshi (本吉村), Utatsu (歌津町), Koizumi (小泉村), Mitake (御嶽村), Oya (大谷村), Hashigami (階上村), Matsuiwa (松岩村), Niizuki (新月村), Shishiori (鹿折), Karakura (唐桑村), Oshima (大島村)).

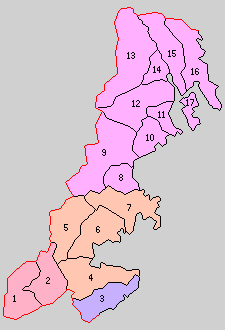
1. Nusazaki; 2. Yokoyama; 3. Jusanhama; 4. Tokura; 5. Iriya; 6. Shizugawa; 7. Utatsu; 8. Koizumi; 9. Mitake; 10. Oya; 11. Hashigami; 12. Matsuiwa; 14. Kesennuma; 15. Shishiori; 16. Karakuwa; 17. Oshima; Purple = Ishinomaki City; Red= Tome City; Orange = Minamisanriku Town; Violet = Kesennuma City

- October 31, 1894: The village of Motoyoshi was elevated to town status and renamed Shizugawa (志津川町)
- November 1, 1906: The village of Nusazaki was elevated to town status and renamed Yanaizu (柳津町)
- November 3, 1941: The village of Mitake was elevated to town status and renamed Tsuya (津谷町)
- April 1, 1951: The village of Shishiori was elevated to town status
- June 1, 1953: Shishiori and the village of Matsuiwa merge with Kesennuma
- February 11, 1955: The village of Karakuwa was elevated to town status
- March 1, 1955: The villages of Tokura and Iriya merge with Shizugawa town.
- March 30, 1955: The town of Tsuya and villages of Koizumi and Oya merge to for the two o Motoyoshi (本吉町); the village of Jusanhama was transferred to Monou District
- April 1, 1955: The villages of Niizuki, Hashikami and Oshima merge form the town of Utatsu (歌津町)
- On April 1, 2005, the town of Tsuyama merged with the eight other towns of the former Tome District to form the city of Tome.
- On October 1, 2005, the town of Shizugawa and the town of Utatsu merged to form the new town of Minamisanriku.
- On March 31, 2006, the town of Karakuwa merged into the city of Kesennuma.
- On September 1, 2009, the town of Motoyoshi merged into the city of Kesennuma.

Motoyoshi District was devastated by the magnitude 9.0 March 11, 2011 earthquake and tsunami which occurred off the coast of Japan; an estimated 9,500 people are reported missing from the town of Minamisanriku alone. Early estimates indicate that this could represent as much as 90% of the total casualties in Japan.
