= Senmaya Station =

Railway station in Ichinoseki, Iwate Prefecture, Japan

Senmaya Station 千厩駅
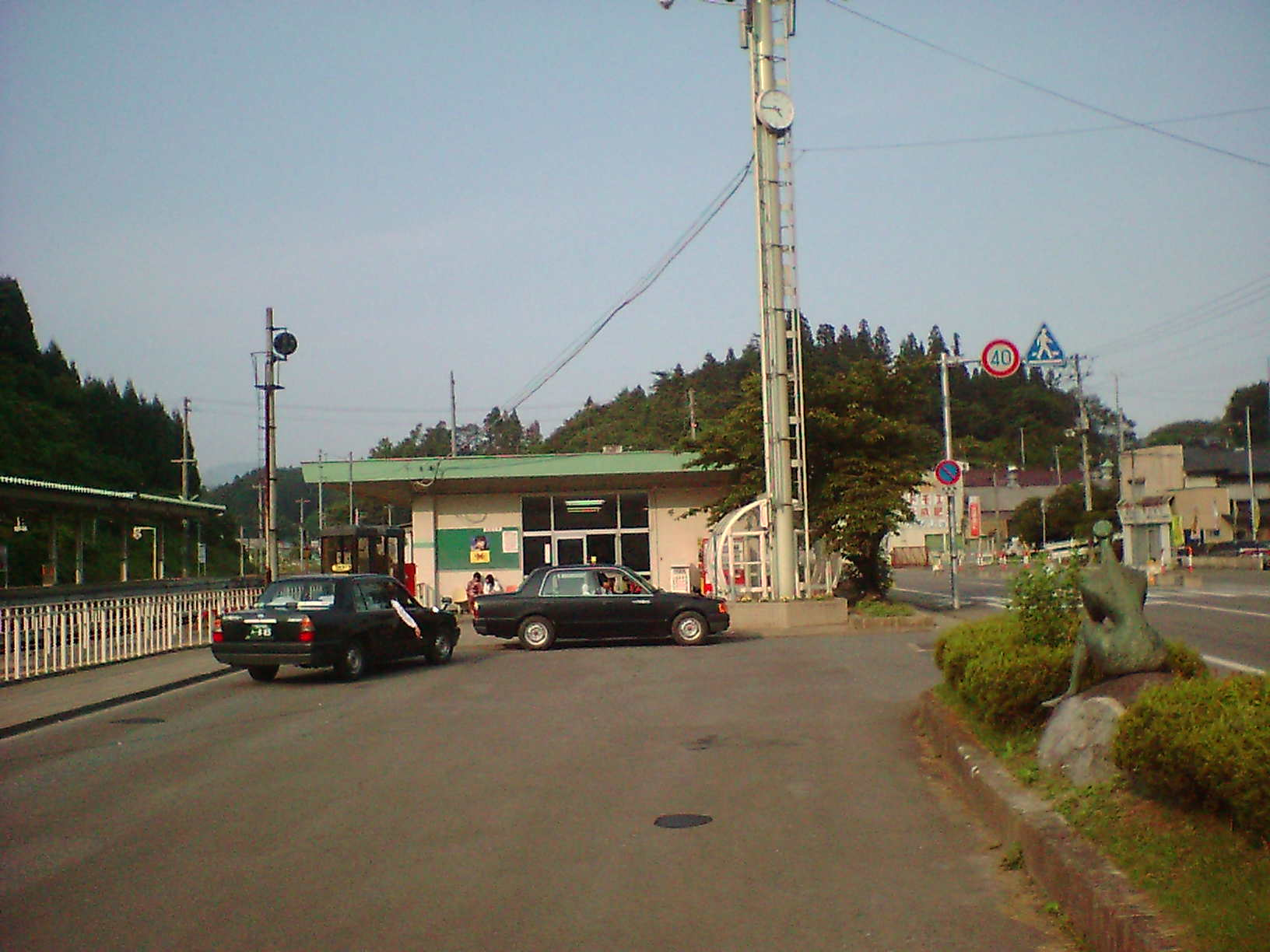
- Senmaya Station in June 2005

General information
- Location: Senmaya-cho Senmaya-aze, Ichinoseki-shi, Iwate-ken 029-0803; Japan
- Coordinates: 38.9249°N 141.3456°E
- Operator: JR East
- Line: ■ Ōfunato Line
- Distance: 39.8 km from Ichinoseki
- Platforms: 1 island platform

Other information
- Status: Staffed (Midori no Madoguchi)
- Website: Official website

History
- Opened: July 15, 1927

Passengers
- FY2018: 199

Services
| Preceding station | JR East | Following station |
|---|---|---|
| Surisawa towards Ichinoseki | Ōfunato Line | Konashi towards Kesennuma |
Location
- Location within Iwate Prefecture Location within Japan

Senmaya Station (千厩駅, Senmaya-eki) is a railway station located in the city of Ichinoseki, Iwate Prefecture, Japan, operated by the East Japan Railway Company (JR East).

== Lines ==
Senmaya Station is served by the Ōfunato Line, and is located 39.8 rail kilometers from the terminus of the line at Ichinoseki Station.

== Station layout ==
The station has a single island platform connected to the station building by a level crossing. The station has a Midori no Madoguchi staffed ticket office.

=== Platforms ===
| 1 | ■ Ōfunato Line | for Ichinoseki |
| 2 | ■ Ōfunato Line | for Kesennuma |

== History ==
Senmaya Station opened on July 15, 1927. The station was absorbed into the JR East network upon the privatization of the Japan National Railways (JNR) on April 1, 1987.

== Passenger statistics ==
In fiscal 2018, the station was used by an average of 199 passengers daily (boarding passengers only).

== Surrounding area ==
- National Route 284
- National Route 456
- former Senmaya Town Hall
- Senmaya Post Office
- Iwate Prefecture Senmaya High School

=== Senmaya Bus Terminal ===
- Iwateken Kotsu
  - Ichinoseki-Ofunato Line・Ichinoseki-Kesennuma Line For Ichinoseki Station
  - Ichinoseki-Ofunato Line For Ofunato Station
  - Ichinoseki-Kesennuma Line For Sakari Station via Kesennuma Station
  - Kesennuma Linner For Kesennuma Station
  - Kesennuma Linner For Ikebukuro Station
  - Senmaya Morioka Line For Morioka Station
  - Hongo Line For Ichinoseki Station via Mataki Station
- Ichinoseki Municipal Bus
  - Okutama Line For Nesan

== Bus routes ==
Senmaya Station Bus stop

- Iwateken Kotsu
  - Ichinoseki-Ofunato Line・Ichinoseki-Kesennuma Line For Ichinoseki Station
  - Ichinoseki-Ofunato Line For Ofunato Station
  - Ichinoseki-Kesennuma Line For Sakari Station via Kesennuma Station
  - Hongo Line For Ichinoseki Station via Mataki Station
- Ichinoseki Municipal Bus
  - Fujisawa Line For Hanaizumi Station
  - Iwashimizu Line For Nakagami

== See also ==
- List of railway stations in Japan
