= Kami-Shishiori Station =

Former railway station in Kesennuma, Miyagi Prefecture, Japan

Kami-Shishiori Station 上鹿折駅
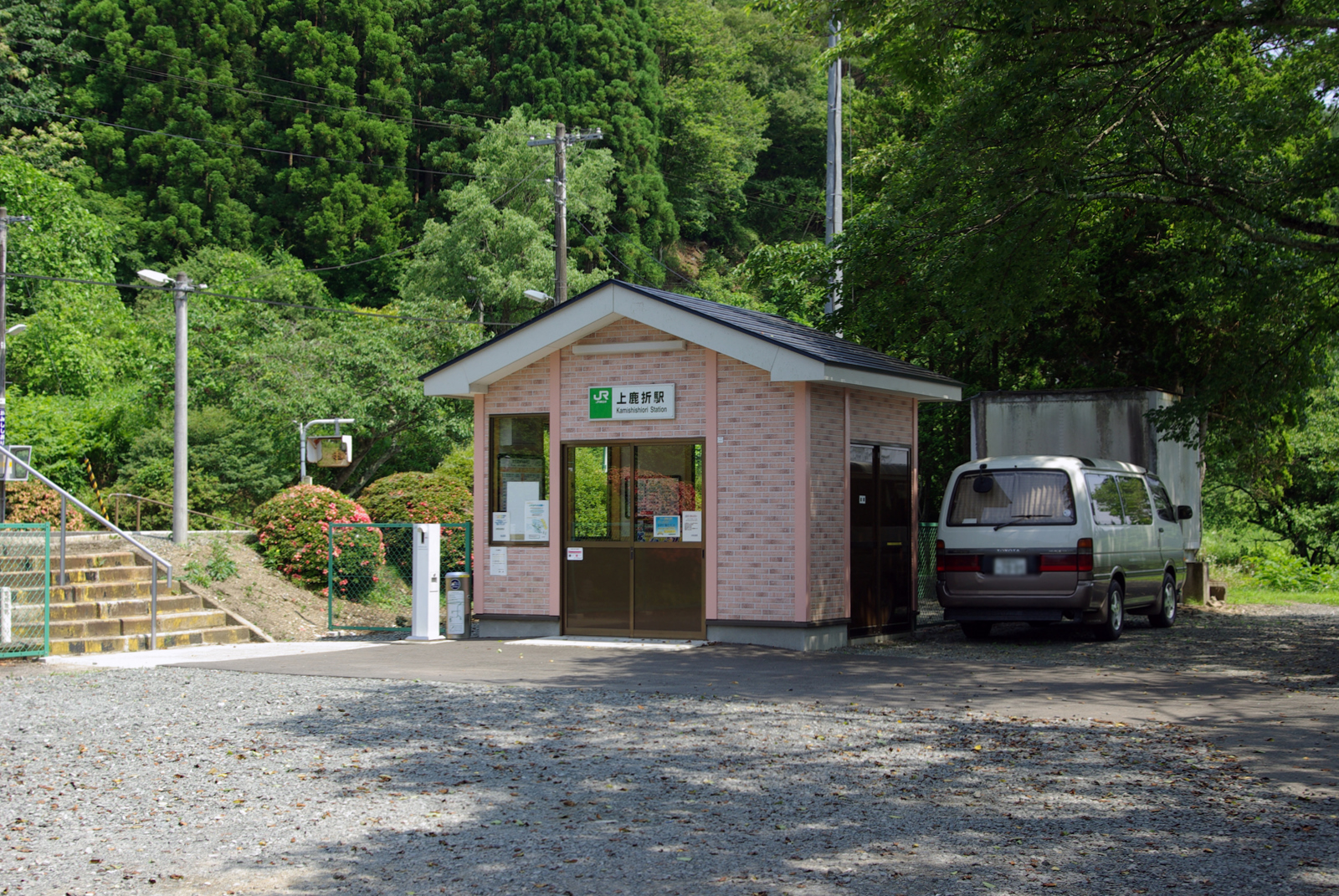
- Kamishishiori Station in July 2009

General information
- Location: Kamihigashigawane 2, Kesennuma, Miyagi （宮城県気仙沼市上東側根2） Japan
- Coordinates: 38°57′39″N 141°34′06″E
- Operator: JR East
- Line: ■ Ōfunato Line
- Platforms: 2 side platforms

History
- Opened: 19 March 1932
- Closed: 11 March 2011

Services
Preceding station	JR East	Following station
Shishiorikarakuwa towards Ichinoseki	Ōfunato Line	Rikuzen-Yahagi towards Sakari
Location
- Location within Japan

Kami-Shishiori Station (上鹿折駅, Kamishishiori-eki) was a JR East railway station located in Kesennuma, Miyagi Prefecture, Japan. The station was closed following the 2011 Tōhoku earthquake and tsunami.

== History ==
Kamishishiori Station opened on 19 March 1932. The station was absorbed into the JR East network upon the privatization of the Japan National Railways (JNR) on April 1, 1987. Operations were suspended after the 11 March 2011 Tōhoku earthquake and tsunami and have been replaced by a provisional bus service. However, there was no bus stops installed by JR East near the station. The station was officially closed on 1 April 2020.

== Lines ==
Kami-Shishiori Station was served by the Ōfunato Line, and is located 69.5 rail kilometers from the terminus of the line at Ichinoseki Station.

== Layout ==
Kami-Shishiori Station had two opposed side platforms connected by a level crossing. The station was unattended.

=== Platforms ===
station side	■ Ōfunato Line	for Rikuzen-Takata and Sakari
opp side	■ Ōfunato Line	for Ichinoseki and Kesennuma

== Surrounding area ==
- Kesennuma Shiroyama Elementary School
