= Rikuchū-Kanzaki Station =

Railway station in Ichinoseki, Iwate Prefecture, Japan

Rikuchū-Kanzaki Station 陸中門崎駅
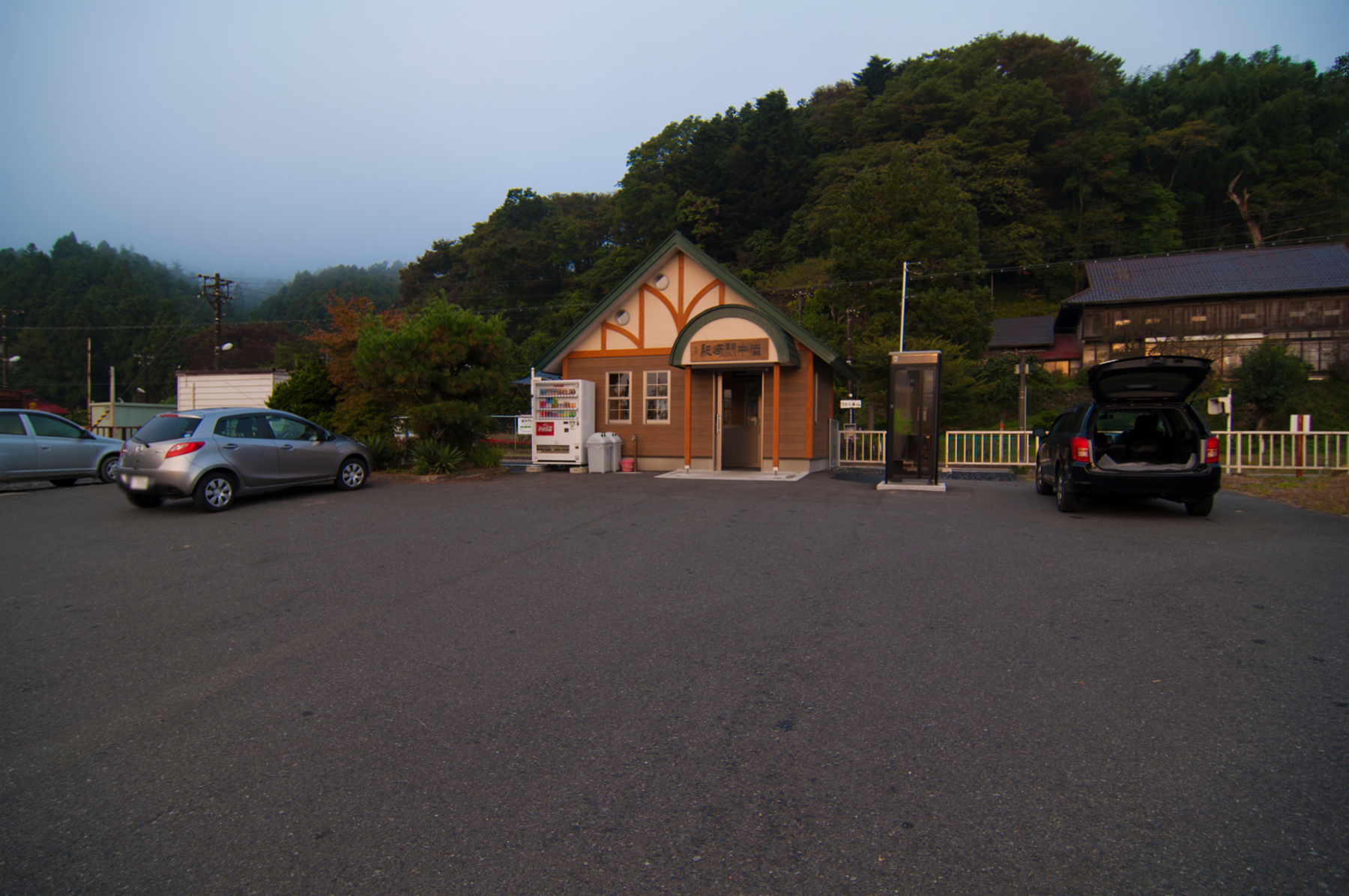
- Rikuchū-Kanzaki Station in October 2010

General information
- Location: Kawasaki-cho Kanzaki, Ichinoseki-shi, Iwate 029-0201; Japan
- Coordinates: 38.9167°N 141.2512°E
- Operator: JR East
- Line: ■ Ōfunato Line
- Distance: 13.7 km from Ichinoseki
- Platforms: 2 side platforms

Other information
- Status: Unstaffed
- Website: Official website

History
- Opened: July 26, 1925

Services
Preceding station	JR East	Following station
Mataki towards Ichinoseki	Ōfunato Line	Iwanoshita towards Kesennuma
Location
- Location within Iwate Prefecture Location within Japan

Rikuchū-Kanzaki Station (陸中門崎駅, Rikuchū-Kanzaki-eki) is a railway station located in the city of Ichinoseki, Iwate Prefecture, Japan, operated by the East Japan Railway Company (JR East).

== Lines ==
Rikuchū-Kanzaki Station is served by the Ōfunato Line, and is located 13.7 rail kilometers from the terminus of the line at Ichinoseki Station.

== Station layout ==
Rikuchū-Kanzaki Station has two unnumbered opposed side platforms connected to the station building by a level crossing. The station is unattended.

=== Platforms ===
station side	■ Ōfunato Line	for Ichinoseki
opposite side	■ Ōfunato Line	for Kesennuma

== History ==
Rikuchū-Kanzaki Station opened on July 26, 1925. The station was absorbed into the JR East network upon the privatization of the Japan National Railways (JNR) on April 1, 1987. A new station building was completed in March 2010.

== Surrounding area ==
- Kawasaki Station Road (shopping area)
- Sunatetsu River

== See also ==
- List of railway stations in Japan
