= Iwanoshita Station =

Railway station in Ichinoseki, Iwate Prefecture, Japan

Iwanoshita Station 岩ノ下駅
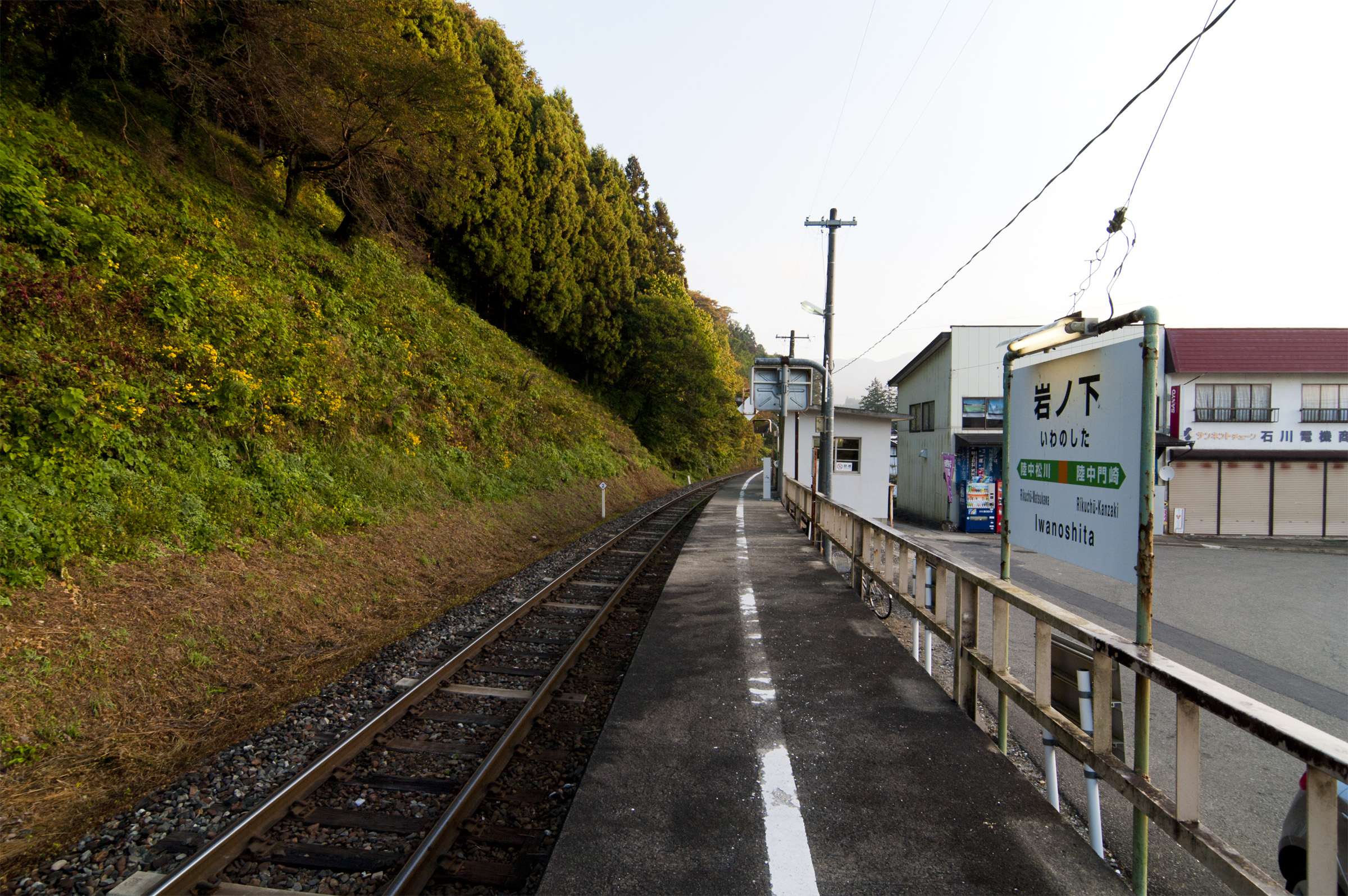
- Iwanoshita Station in October 2010

General information
- Location: Higashiyama-cho Matsukawa-aze Iwanoshita 183, Ichinoseki-shi, Iwate-ken 029-0303; Japan
- Coordinates: 38.9480°N 141.2452°E
- Operator: JR East
- Line: ■ Ōfunato Line
- Distance: 17.5 km from Ichinoseki
- Platforms: 1 side platform

Other information
- Status: Unstaffed
- Website: Official website

History
- Opened: December 1, 1966

Services
Preceding station	JR East	Following station
Rikuchū-Kanzaki towards Ichinoseki	Ōfunato Line	Rikuchū-Matsukawa towards Kesennuma
Location
- Location within Iwate Prefecture Location within Japan

Iwanoshita Station (岩ノ下駅, Iwanoshita-eki) is a railway station located in the city of Ichinoseki, Iwate Prefecture, Japan, operated by the East Japan Railway Company (JR East).

== Lines ==
Iwanoshita Station is served by the Ōfunato Line, and is located 17.5 rail kilometers from the terminus of the line at Ichinoseki Station.

== Station layout ==
Iwanoshita Station has one side platform serving a single bi-directional track. There is no station building, but only a shelter for waiting passengers. The station is unattended.

== History ==
Iwanoshita Station opened on December 1, 1966. The station was absorbed into the JR East network upon the privatization of the Japan National Railways (JNR) on April 1, 1987.

== Surrounding area ==
Some small businesses and stores have grown up around the station.

- Sunatetsu River
- Iwanoshita Police Office

== See also ==
- List of railway stations in Japan
