= Konashi Station =

Railway station in Ichinoseki, Iwate Prefecture, Japan

Konishi Station 小梨駅
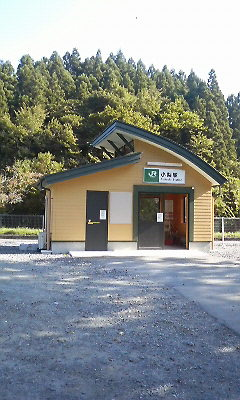
- Konashi Station in December 2009

General information
- Location: Senmaya-cho Kiyota-aze Tahata 28, Ichinoseki-shi, Iwate-ken 029-0801; Japan
- Coordinates: 38.9325°N 141.3842°E
- Operator: JR East
- Line: ■ Ōfunato Line
- Distance: 43.4 km from Ichinoseki
- Platforms: 1 side platform

Other information
- Status: Unstaffed
- Website: Official website

History
- Opened: September 2, 1928

Services
Preceding station	JR East	Following station
Senmaya towards Ichinoseki	Ōfunato Line	Yagoshi towards Kesennuma
Location
- Location within Iwate Prefecture Location within Japan

Konashi Station (小梨駅, Konashi-eki) is a railway station located in the city of Ichinoseki, Iwate Prefecture, Japan, operated by the East Japan Railway Company (JR East).

== Lines ==
Konashi Station is served by the Ōfunato Line, and is located 43.4 rail kilometers from the terminus of the line at Ichinoseki Station.

== Station layout ==
The station has one side platform serving a single bi-directional track. The station is unattended.

== History ==
Konashi Station opened on September 2, 1928. The station was absorbed into the JR East network upon the privatization of the Japan National Railways (JNR) on April 1, 1987. A new station building was completed in October 2006.

== Surrounding area ==
- National Route 284
- Seitendaii Ruins

== See also ==
- List of railway stations in Japan
