= Geibikei Station =

Railway station in Ichinoseki, Iwate Prefecture, Japan

Geibikei Station 猊鼻渓駅
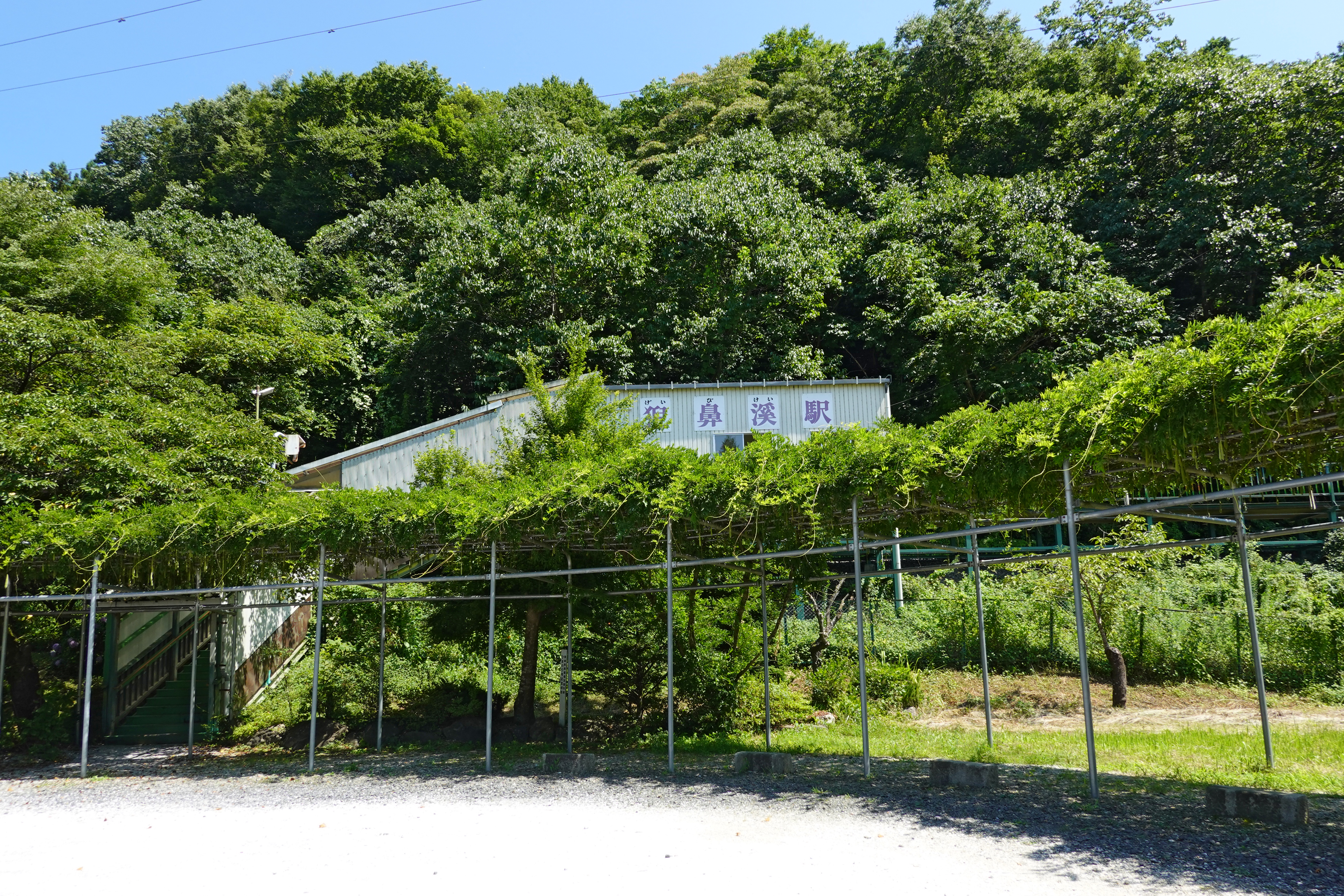
- Geibikei Station in July 2023

General information
- Location: Higashiyama-cho Nagasaka-aze Machiura 393, Ichinoseki-shi, Iwate-ken 029-0302; Japan
- Coordinates: 38.9892°N 141.2533°E
- Operator: JR East
- Line: ■ Ōfunato Line
- Distance: 23.3 km from Ichinoseki
- Platforms: 1 side platform

Other information
- Status: Unstaffed
- Website: Official website

History
- Opened: November 1, 1986

Services
Preceding station	JR East	Following station
Rikuchū-Matsukawa towards Ichinoseki	Ōfunato Line	Shibajuku towards Kesennuma
Location
- Location within Iwate Prefecture Location within Japan

Geibikei Station (猊鼻渓駅, Geibikei-eki) is a railway station located in the city of Ichinoseki, Iwate Prefecture, Japan, operated by the East Japan Railway Company (JR East).

== History ==
Geibikei Station opened on November 1, 1986. The station was absorbed into the JR East network upon the privatization of the Japanese National Railways (JNR) on April 1, 1987.

== Lines ==
Geibikei Station is served by the Ōfunato Line, and is located 23.3 rail kilometers from the terminus of the line at Ichinoseki Station.

== Layout ==
Geibikei Station has one side platform serving a single bi-directional track. There is no station building. The station is unattended.

== Surrounding area ==
- Geibikei Gorge (猊鼻渓)
- Yūben Cave

== See also ==
- List of railway stations in Japan
