= Shibajuku Station =

Railway station in Ichinoseki, Iwate Prefecture, Japan

Shibajuku Station 柴宿駅
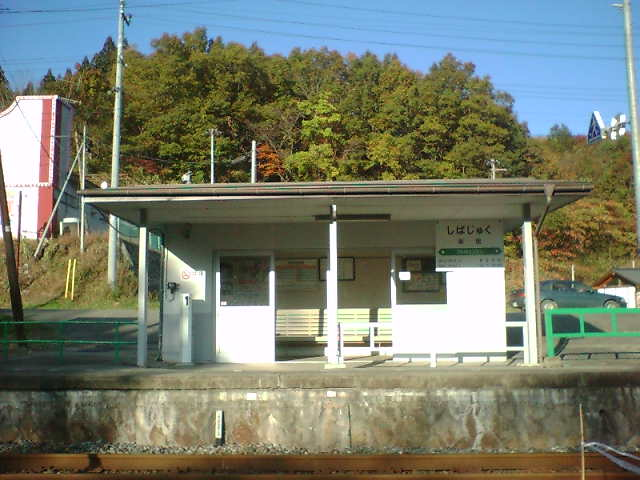
- Shibajuku Station in November 2005

General information
- Location: Higashiyama-cho Nagasaka-aze Shibajuku, Ichinoseki-shi, Iwate-ken 029-0302; Japan
- Coordinates: 38.9967°N 141.2723°E
- Operator: JR East
- Line: ■ Ōfunato Line
- Distance: 26.1 km from Ichinoseki
- Platforms: 1 side platform

Other information
- Status: Unstaffed
- Website: Official website

History
- Opened: May 15, 1962

Services
Preceding station	JR East	Following station
Geibikei towards Ichinoseki	Ōfunato Line	Surisawa towards Kesennuma
Location
- Location within Iwate Prefecture Location within Japan

Shibajuku Station (柴宿駅, Shibajuku-eki) is a railway station located in the city of Ichinoseki, Iwate Prefecture, Japan, operated by the East Japan Railway Company (JR East).

== History ==
Shibajuku Station opened on May 15, 1962. The station was absorbed into the JR East network upon the privatization of the Japan National Railways (JNR) on April 1, 1987.

== Lines ==
The station is served by the Ōfunato Line, and is located 26.1 rail kilometers from the terminus of the line at Ichinoseki Station.

== Station layout ==
Shibajuku Station has one ground-level side platform serving a single bi-directional track. The station is unattended.

== Surrounding area ==
- Yūben Cave (Limestone Cave)

== See also ==
- List of railway stations in Japan
