= Otomo Station =

Former railway station in Rikuzentakata, Iwate Prefecture, Japan

Otomo Station 小友駅
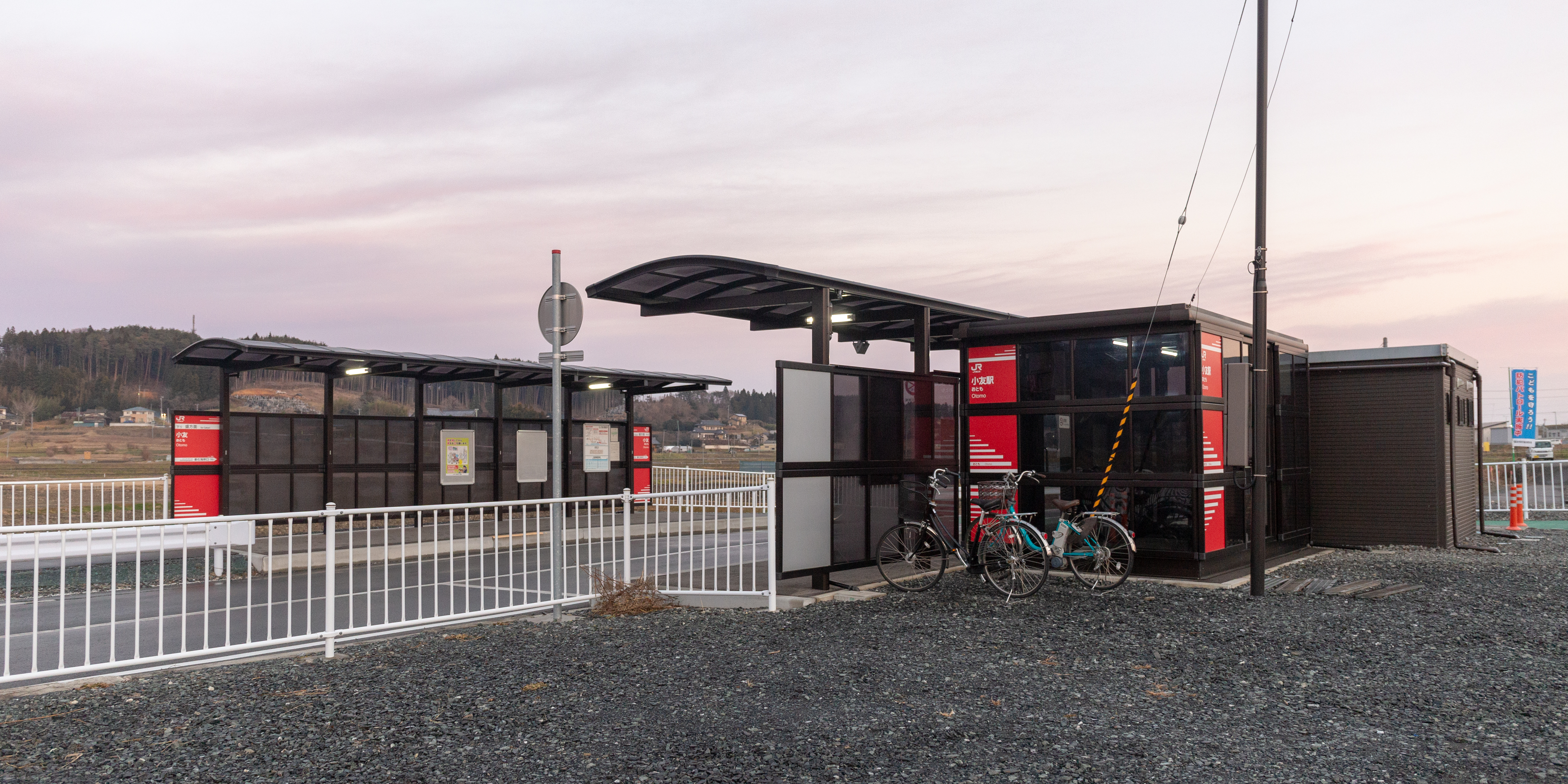
- Otomo Station in December 2018

General information
- Location: Otomo-cho Shimoniida 15, Rikuzentakata-shi, Iwate-ken 029-2207; Japan
- Coordinates: 38°59′21″N 141°41′59″E
- Operator: JR East
- Line: ■ Ōfunato Line
- Distance: 92.8 km from Ichinoseki
- Platforms: 2 side platforms

Construction
- Structure type: At grade

Other information
- Status: Staffed
- Website: Official website

History
- Opened: 15 December 1933
- Closed: 11 March 2011

Passengers
- FY2010: 102 daily

Services
Preceding station	JR East	Following station
Takata Hospital towards Maeyachi	Kesennuma / Ōfunato BRT	Goishi Kaiganguchi towards Sakari

Former services
Preceding station	JR East	Following station
Wakinosawa towards Ichinoseki	Ōfunato Line	Hosoura towards Sakari
Location
- Location within Japan

Otomo Station (小友駅, Otomo-eki) was a JR East railway station located in Rikuzentakata, Iwate Prefecture, Japan. The station, as well as most of the structures in the surrounding area, was destroyed by the 2011 Tōhoku earthquake and tsunami and has now been replaced by a provisional bus rapid transit line.

== Lines ==
Otomo Station was served by the Ōfunato Line, and is located 92.8 rail kilometers from the terminus of the line at Ichinoseki Station.

== Station layout ==
Otomo Station had two opposed side platforms, connected to the station building by a level crossing. The station was staffed.

=== Platforms ===
1	■ Ōfunato Line	for Ichinoseki and Kesennuma
2	■ Ōfunato Line	for Sakari

== History ==
Otomo Station opened on 15 December 1933. On 23 May 1960, a tsunami caused by the Great Chilean earthquake submerged both this station and neighbouring Wakinosawa Station, making the line temporarily impassable until the water is removed. The station was absorbed into the JR East network upon the privatization of the Japan National Railways (JNR) on April 1, 1987. The station was one of six stations on the Ōfunato Line destroyed by the 11 March 2011 Tōhoku earthquake and tsunami. Services have now been replaced by a BRT.

== Surrounding area ==
- National Route 340
- Keizo-ji temple
- Rikenzen-Otomo Post Office

== See also ==
- List of railway stations in Japan
