= Rikuchū-Matsukawa Station =

Railway station in Ichinoseki, Iwate Prefecture, Japan

Rikuchū-Matsukawa Station 陸中松川駅
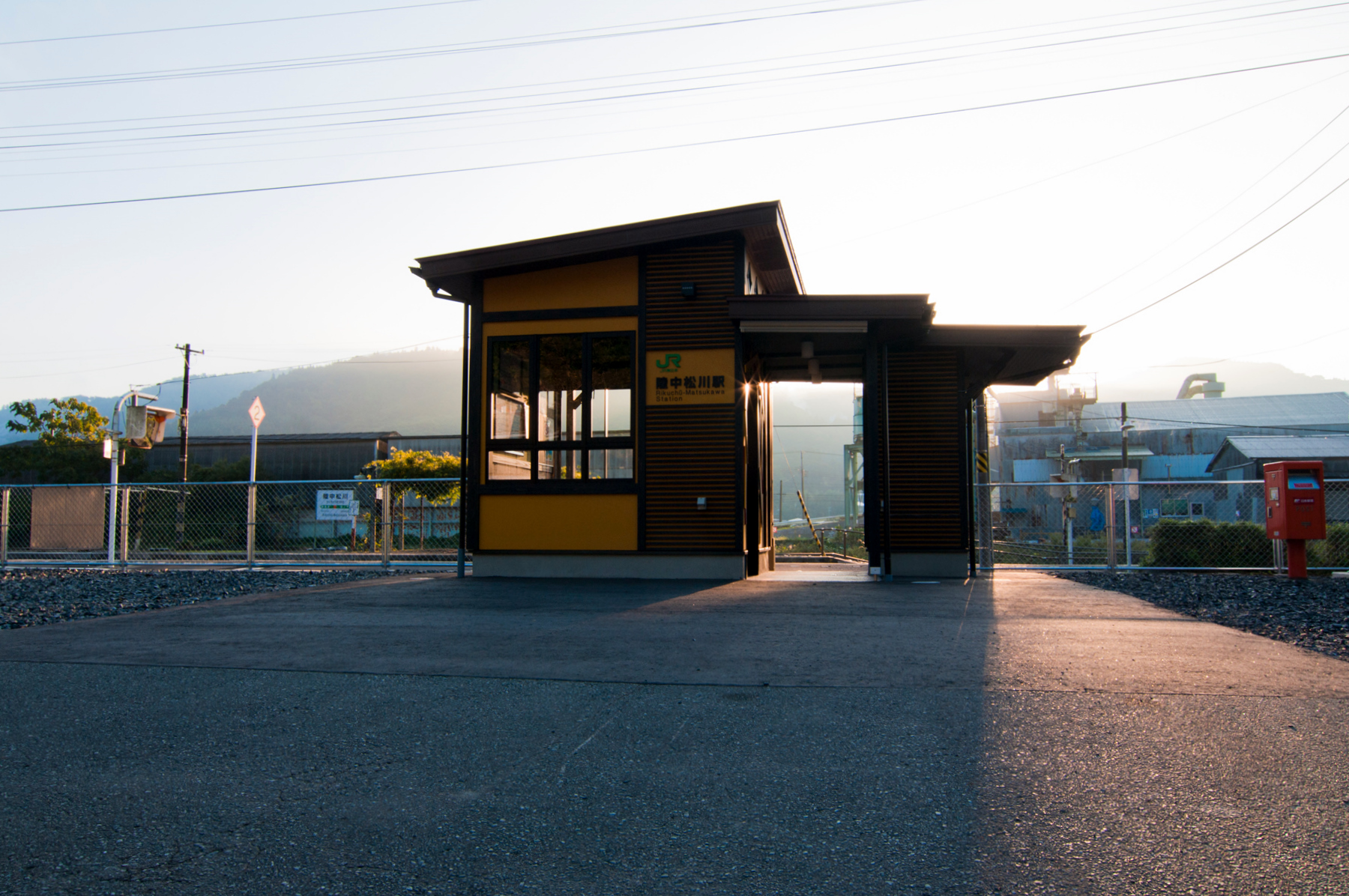
- Rikuchū-Matsukawa Station in October 2010

General information
- Location: Higashiyama-cho Matsukawa-aze Takinosawa 190, Ichinoseki-shi, Iwate-ken 029-0303; Japan
- Coordinates: 38.9774°N 141.2382°E
- Operator: JR East
- Line: ■ Ōfunato Line
- Distance: 21.3 km from Ichinoseki
- Platforms: 2 side platforms

Other information
- Status: Unstaffed
- Website: Official website

History
- Opened: July 26, 1925

Services
Preceding station	JR East	Following station
Iwanoshita towards Ichinoseki	Ōfunato Line	Geibikei towards Kesennuma
Location
- Location within Iwate Prefecture Location within Japan

Rikuchū-Matsukawa Station (陸中松川駅, Rikuchū-Matsukawa-eki) is a railway station located in the city of Ichinoseki, Iwate Prefecture, Japan, operated by the East Japan Railway Company (JR East).

== Lines ==
Rikuchū-Matsukawa Station is served by the Ōfunato Line, and is located 21.3 rail kilometers from the terminus of the line at Ichinoseki Station.

== Station layout ==
The station has two opposed side platforms connected to the station building by a level crossing. The station is unattended.

=== Platforms ===
1	■ Ōfunato Line	for Ichinoseki
2	■ Ōfunato Line	for Kesennuma

== History ==
Rikuchū-Matsukawa Station opened on July 26, 1925. The station was absorbed into the JR East network upon the privatization of the Japanese National Railways (JNR) on April 1, 1987. A new station building was completed in March 2010.

== Surrounding area ==
- Tohoku Stone Mine
- The House of Sun and Wind (Museum of stone and Kenji Miyazawa)
- Sunatetsu River

== See also ==
- List of railway stations in Japan
