= Orikabe Station =

Railway station in Ichinoseki, Iwate Prefecture, Japan

Orikabe Station 折壁駅
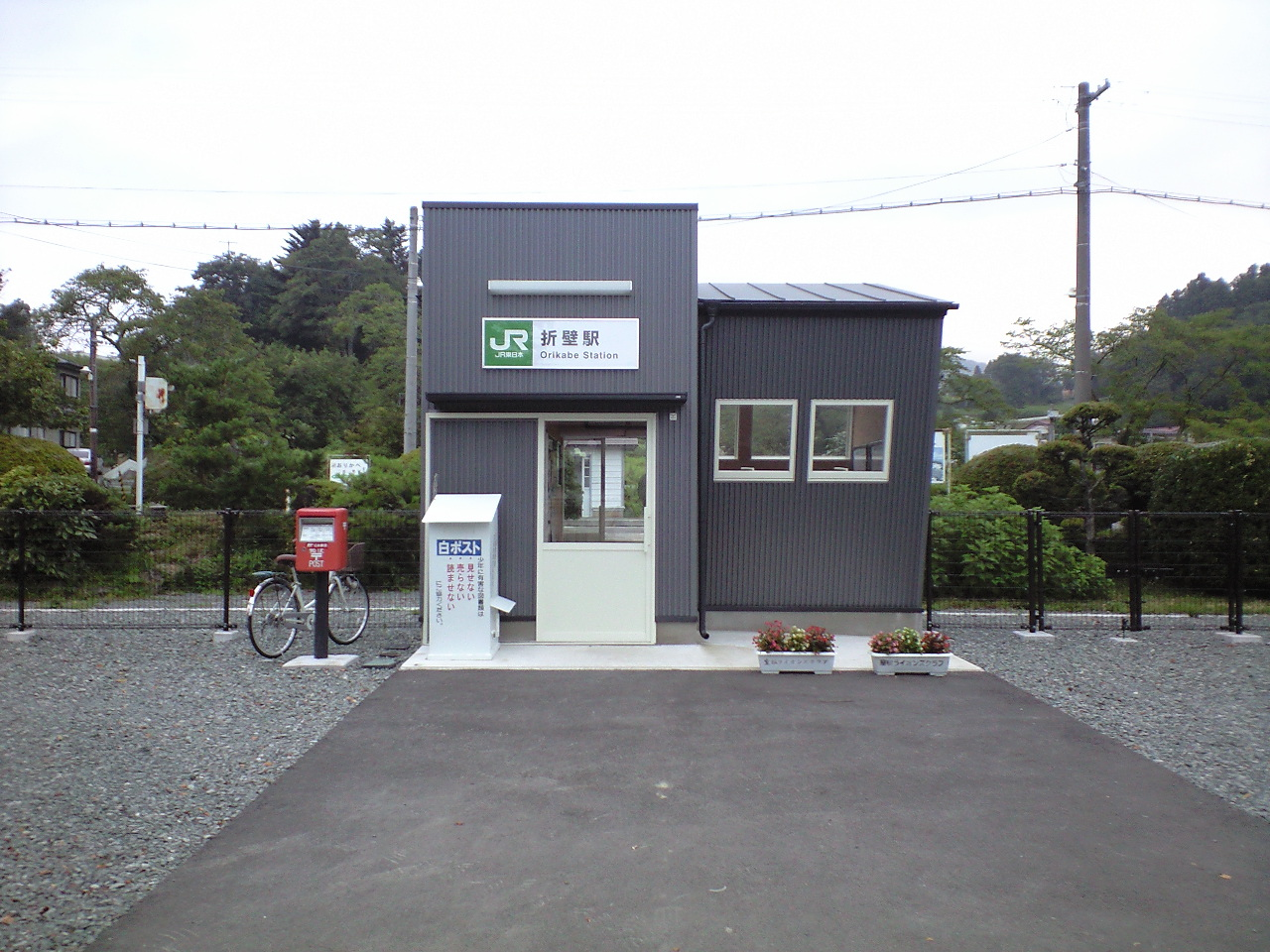
- Orikabe Station in April 2011

General information
- Location: Murone-cho Orikabe-aze Osato 126, Ichinoseki-shi, Iwate-ken 029-1201; Japan
- Coordinates: 38.9396°N 141.4522°E
- Operator: JR East
- Line: ■ Ōfunato Line
- Distance: 47.6 km from Ichinoseki
- Platforms: 2 side platforms

Other information
- Status: Unstaffed
- Website: Official website

History
- Opened: September 2, 1928

Services
Preceding station	JR East	Following station
Yagoshi towards Ichinoseki	Ōfunato Line	Niitsuki towards Kesennuma
Location
- Location within Iwate Prefecture Location within Japan

Orikabe Station (折壁駅, Orikabe-eki) is a railway station located in the city of Ichinoseki, Iwate Prefecture, Japan, operated by the East Japan Railway Company (JR East).

== Lines ==
Orikabe Station is served by the Ōfunato Line, and is located 47.6 rail kilometers from the terminus of the line at Ichinoseki Station.

== Station layout ==
The station has two opposed side platforms connected to the station building by a level crossing. The platforms are unnumbered. The station is unattended.

=== Platforms ===
Station side	■ Ōfunato Line	for Ichinoseki
Opposite side	■ Ōfunato Line	for Kesennuma

== History ==
Orikabe Station opened on September 2, 1928. The station was absorbed into the JR East network upon the privatization of the Japan National Railways (JNR) on April 1, 1987. A new station building was completed in November 2007.

== Surrounding area ==
- National Route 284
- Mount Murone
- Murone Kirameki Park

== See also ==
- List of railway stations in Japan
