= Surisawa Station =

Railway station in Ichinoseki, Iwate Prefecture, Japan

Surisawa Station 摺沢駅
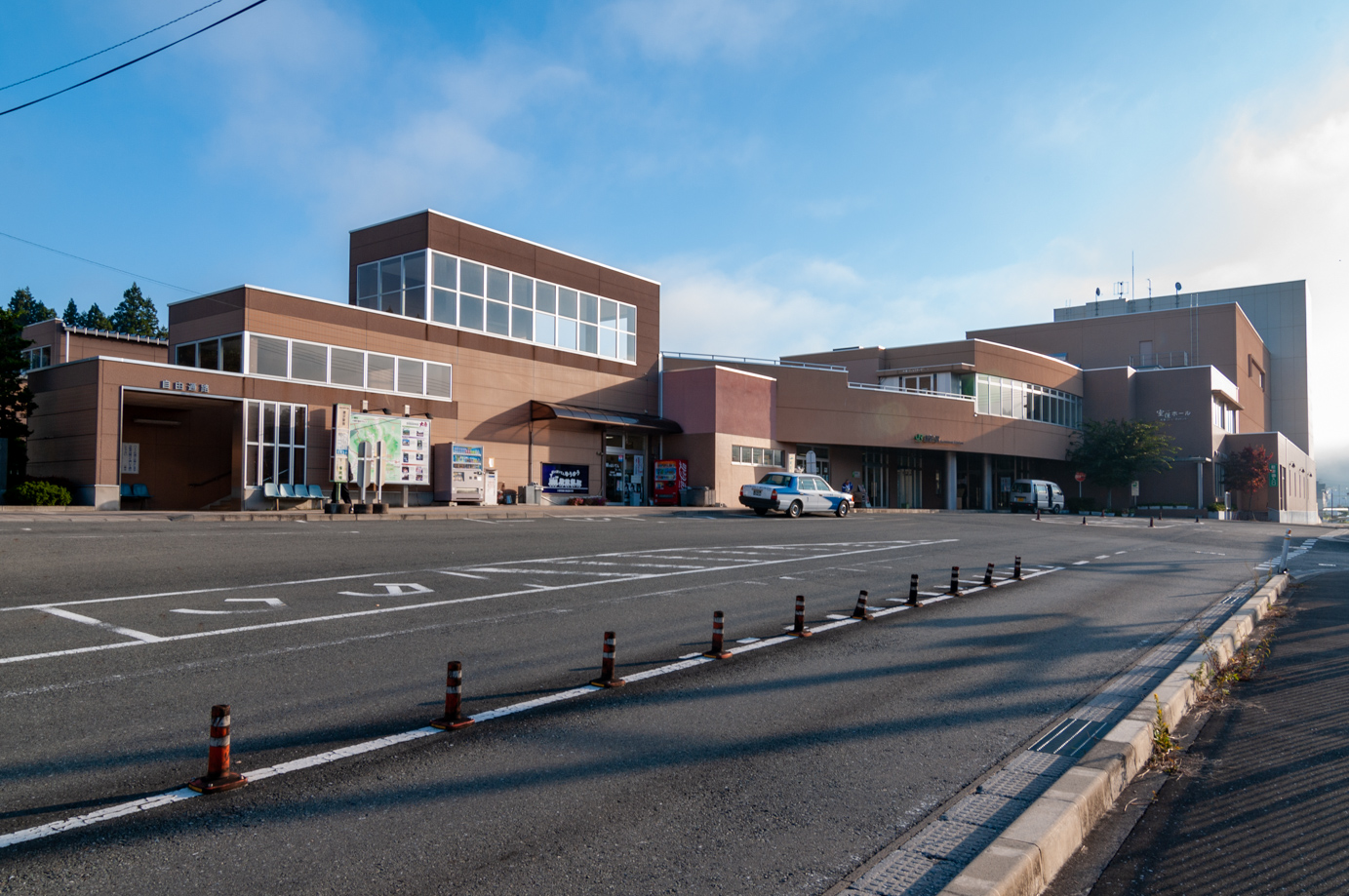
- Surisawa Station in October 2010

General information
- Location: Daito-cho Surisawa-aze, Ichinoseki-shi, Iwate-ken 029-0523; Japan
- Coordinates: 38.995864°N 141.321403°E
- Operator: JR East
- Line: ■ Ōfunato Line
- Distance: 30.6 km from Ichinoseki
- Platforms: 2 side platforms

Other information
- Status: Staffed (Midori no Madoguchi)
- Website: Official website

History
- Opened: July 26, 1925

Passengers
- FY2018: 241

Services
Preceding station	JR East	Following station
Shibajuku towards Ichinoseki	Ōfunato Line	Senmaya towards Kesennuma
Location
- Location within Iwate Prefecture Location within Japan

Surisawa Station (摺沢駅, Surisawa-eki) is a railway station located in the city of Ichinoseki, Iwate Prefecture, Japan, operated by the East Japan Railway Company (JR East).

== Lines ==
Surisawa Station is served by the Ōfunato Line, and is located 30.6 rail kilometers from the terminus of the line at Ichinoseki Station.

== Station layout ==
The station has a two opposed side platforms connected to the station building by a footbridge. The station has a Midori no Madoguchi staffed ticket office.

=== Platforms ===
1	■ Ōfunato Line	for Ichinoseki
2	■ Ōfunato Line	for Kesennuma

== History ==
Surisawa Station opened on July 26, 1925. The station was absorbed into the JR East network upon the privatization of the Japan National Railways (JNR) on April 1, 1987.

== Passenger statistics ==
In fiscal 2018, the station was used by an average of 241 passengers daily (boarding passengers only).

== Surrounding area ==
- National Route 343
- National Route 456
- Oguro Waterfall
- Surisawa Park

== See also ==
- List of railway stations in Japan
