= Shishiorikarakuwa Station =

Former railway station in Kesennuma, Miyagi Prefecture, Japan

Shishiorikarakuwa Station 鹿折唐桑駅
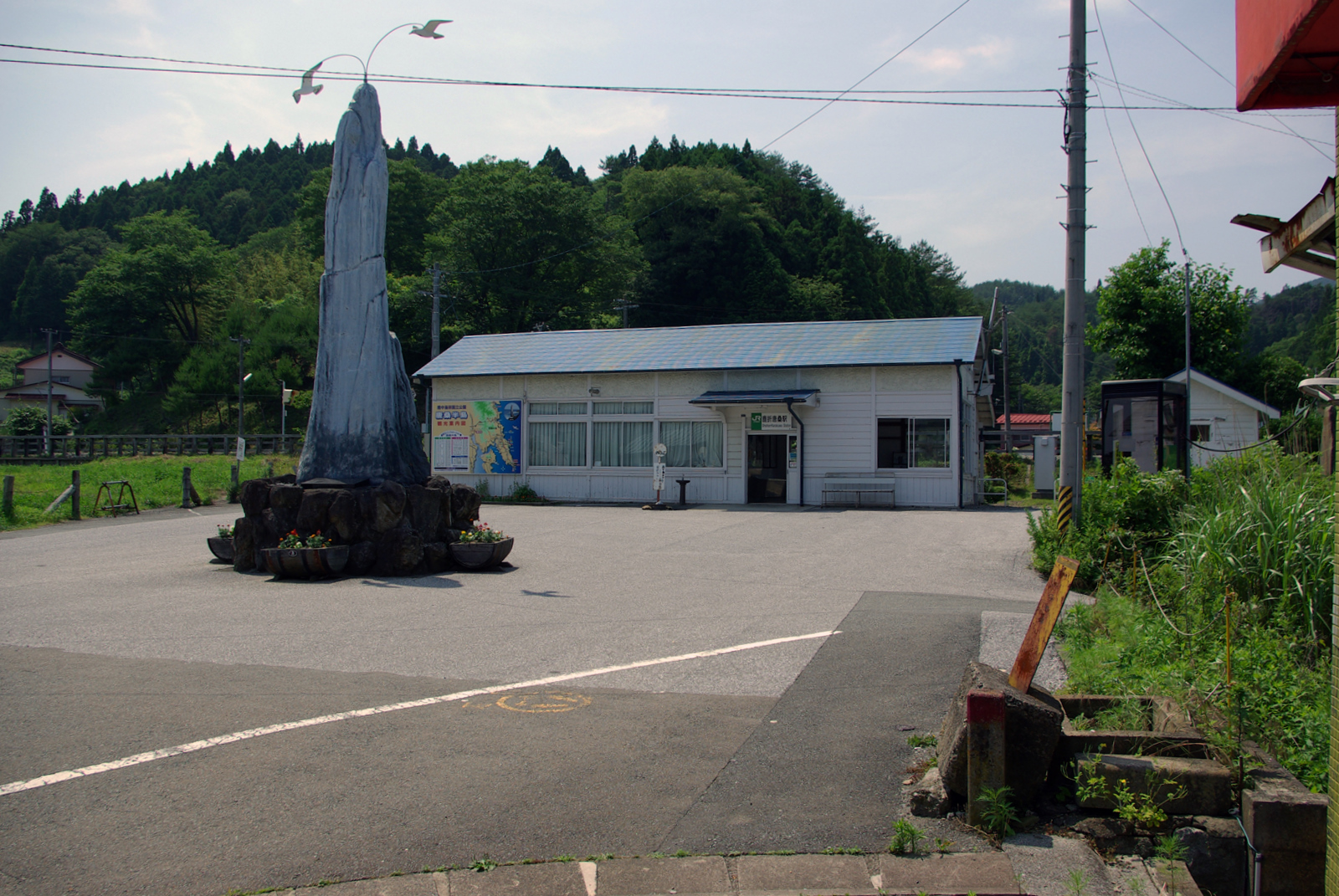
- Shishiorikarakuwa Station in July 2009

General information
- Location: Kamihigashigawa 2, Kesennuma, Miyagi （宮城県気仙沼市新浜町一丁目8） Japan
- Coordinates: 38°54′56″N 141°34′46″E
- Operator: JR East
- Line: ■ Ōfunato Line
- Platforms: 1 side platform

History
- Opened: 19 March 1932
- Closed: 11 March 2011
- Former names: Shishiori (until 1985)

Services
Preceding station	JR East	Following station
Naiwan-Iriguchi (Yōkamachi) towards Maeyachi	Kesennuma / Ōfunato BRT	Hachiman-Ohashi towards Sakari
Kesennuma Terminus	Kesennuma / Ōfunato BRT branch service	Kami-Shishiori Terminus

Former services
Preceding station	JR East	Following station
Kesennuma towards Ichinoseki	Ōfunato Line	Kami-Shishiori towards Sakari
Location
- Location within Japan

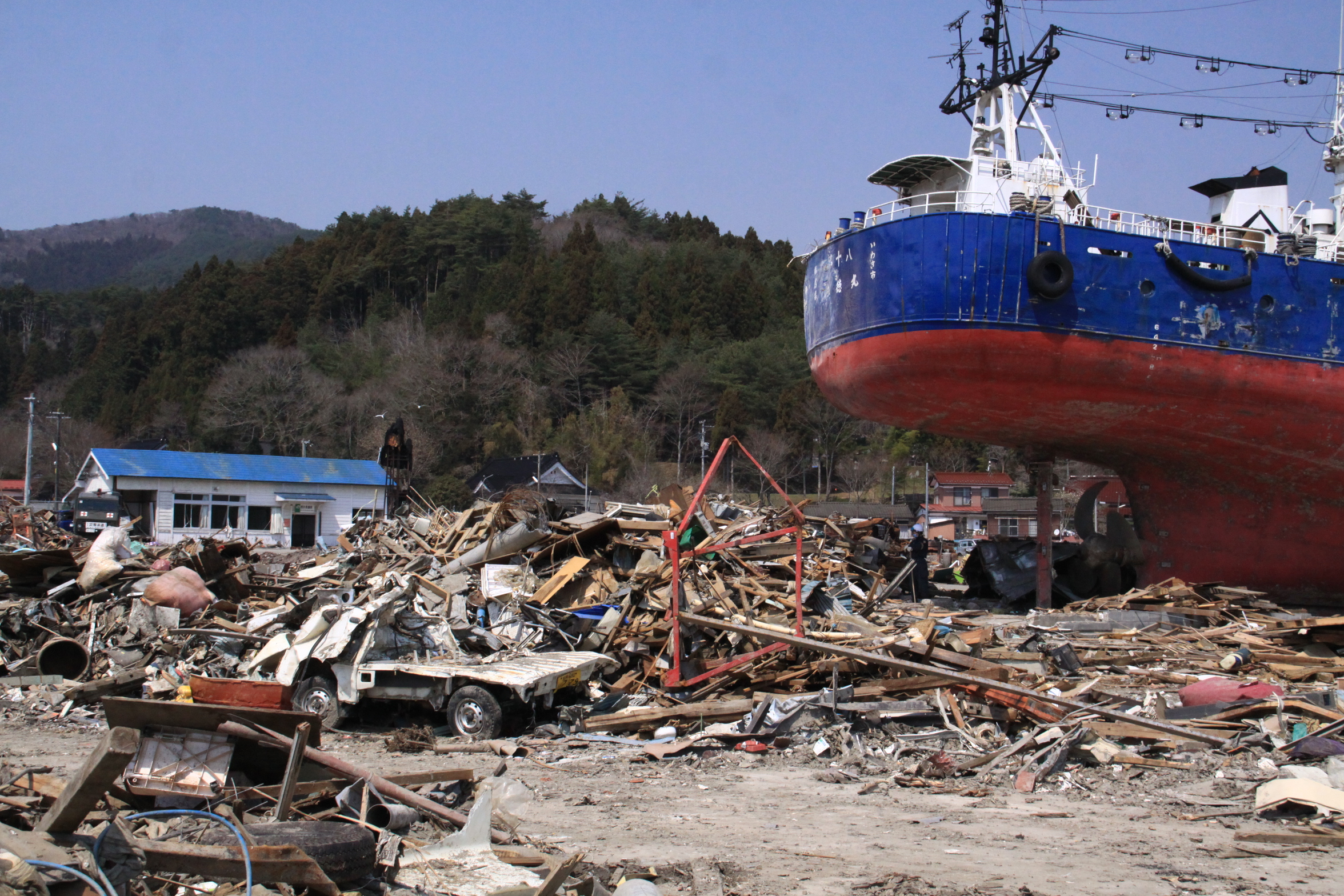
Shishiorikarakuwa Station after the 2011 Tsunami

Shishiorikarakuwa Station (鹿折唐桑駅, Shishiorikarakuwa-eki) was a JR East railway station located in Kesennuma, Miyagi Prefecture, Japan. The station was destroyed by the 2011 Tōhoku earthquake and tsunami and has now been replaced by a provisional bus rapid transit line.

== Lines ==
Shishiorikarakuwa Station was served by the Ōfunato Line, and is located 64.2 rail kilometers from the terminus of the line at Ichinoseki Station.

== Station layout ==
Shishiorikarakuwa Station had a single side platform serving a single bi-directional track. The station was unattended.

== History ==
Shishiorikarakuwa Station opened on 19 March 1932 as Shishiori Station (鹿折駅; Shishiori eki). It was renamed to its present name on 1 November 1986. The station was absorbed into the JR East network upon the privatization of the Japan National Railways (JNR) on April 1, 1987. The station was completely destroyed by the 11 March 2011 Tōhoku earthquake and tsunami.

== Surrounding area ==
- Kesennuma Shishiori Elementary School
- Kesennuma Shishiori Middle School
- Kesennuma Shishiori Post Office
