= Rikuzen-Takata Station =

Former railway station in Rikuzentakata, Iwate Prefecture, Japan

Rikuzen-Takata 陸前高田
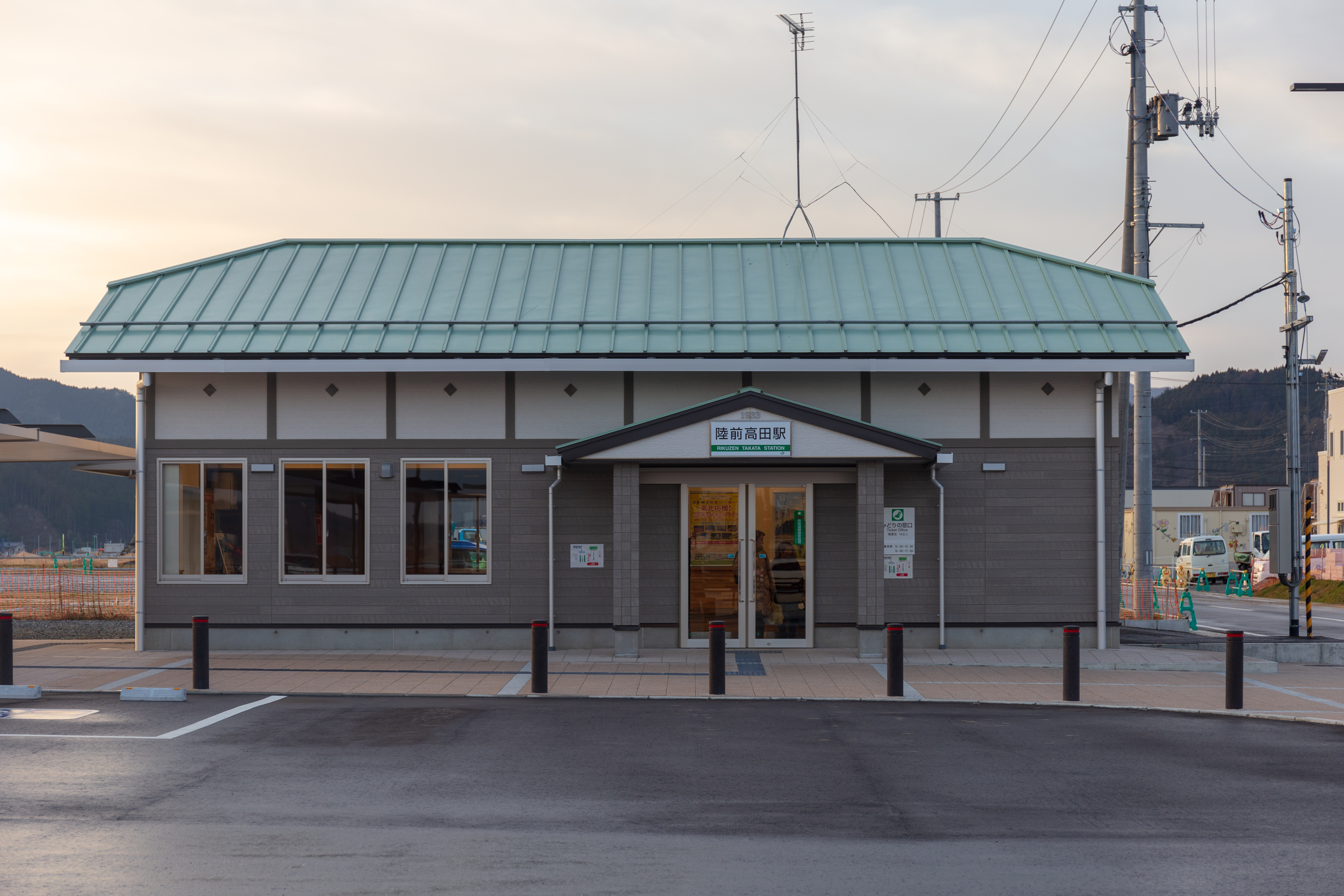
- Rikuzen-Takata Station in December 2018

General information
- Location: Takata-cho Naruishi 42-5, Rikuzentakata-shi, Iwate-ken 029-2205; Japan
- Coordinates: 39°00′46″N 141°37′33″E
- Operator: JR East
- Line: ■ Ōfunato Line
- Distance: 85.4 km from Ichinoseki
- Platforms: 2 side platforms

Construction
- Structure type: At grade

Other information
- Status: Staffed
- Website: Official website

History
- Opened: 15 December 1933
- Closed: 11 March 2011

Passengers
- FY2010: 220 daily

Services
Preceding station	JR East	Following station
Tochigasawa-Kouen towards Rikuzen-Yahagi	Kesennuma / Ōfunato BRT branch service	Takatakoukomae towards Sakari
Kiseki-No-Ippommatsu towards Maeyachi	Kesennuma / Ōfunato BRT	Takatakoukomae towards Sakari

Former services
Preceding station	JR East	Following station
Takekoma towards Ichinoseki	Ōfunato Line	Wakinosawa towards Sakari
Location
- Location within Japan

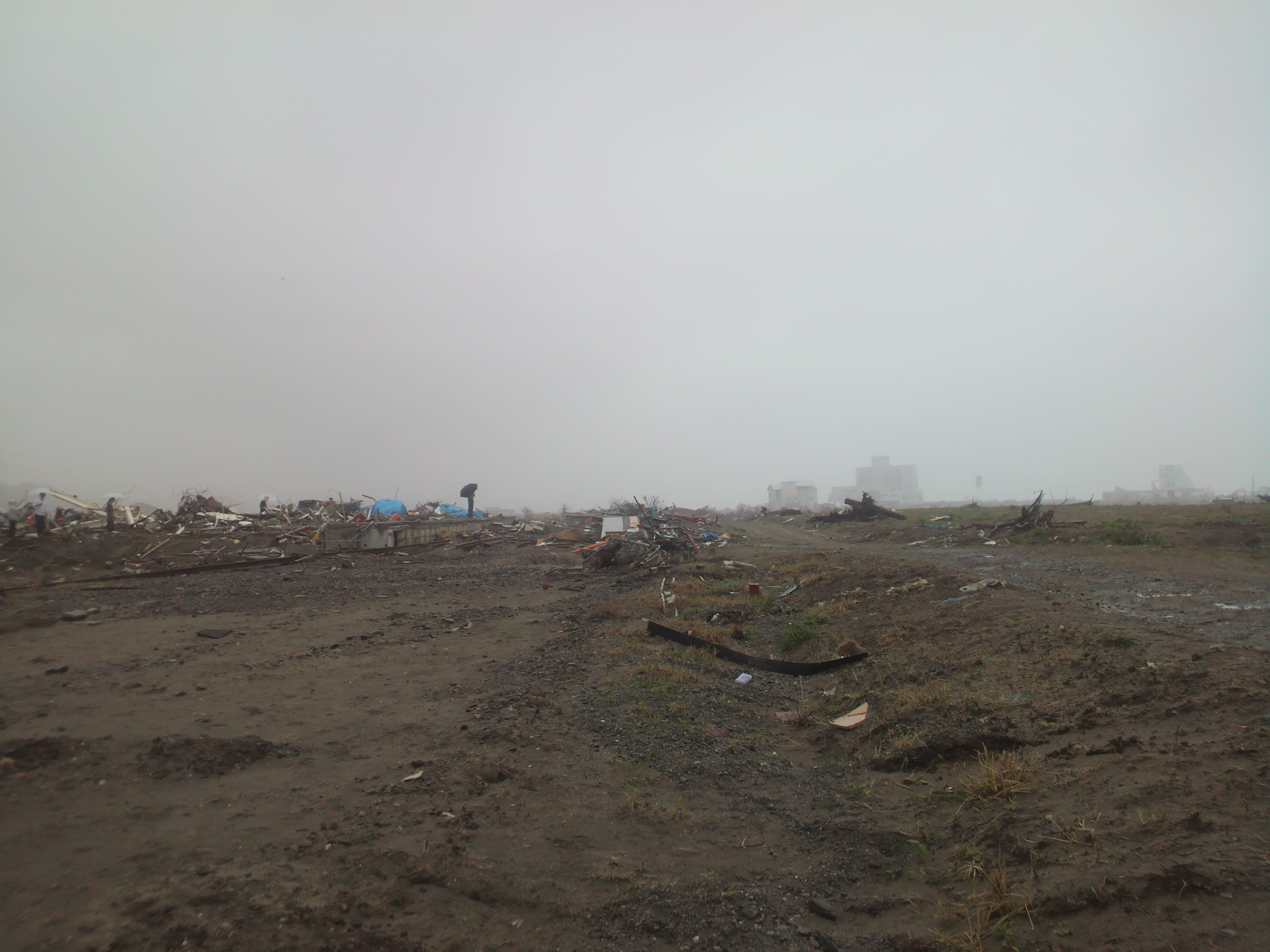
Rikuzen-Takata Station 2 months after 2011 Tohoku earthquake

Rikuzen-Takata Station (陸前高田駅, Rikuzen-Takata-eki) was a JR East railway station located in Rikuzentakata, Iwate Prefecture, Japan. The station, as well as most of the structures in the surrounding area, was destroyed by the 2011 Tōhoku earthquake and tsunami and has now been replaced by a bus rapid transit line.

== Lines ==
Rikuzen-Takata Station was served by the Ōfunato Line, and is located 85.4 rail kilometers from the terminus of the line at Ichinoseki Station.

== Station layout ==
Rikuzen-Takata Station had two opposed side platforms, connected by a level crossing. The station had a Midori no Madoguchi staffed ticket office.

=== Platforms ===
1	■ Ōfunato Line	for Sakari
2	■ Ōfunato Line	for Ichinoseki and Kesennuma

== History ==
Rikuzen-Takata Station opened on 15 December 1933. The station was absorbed into the JR East network upon the privatization of the Japan National Railways (JNR) on April 1, 1987. The station was one of six stations on the Ōfunato Line destroyed by the 11 March 2011 Tōhoku earthquake and tsunami, which also killed the station staff. Services have now been replaced by BRT.

== Surrounding area ==
- Rikuzen-Takata city hall
- Rikuzen-Takata bus terminal
- Rikuzen-Takata Post Office
- Takata-matsubara

== See also ==
- List of railway stations in Japan
