= Hosoura Station =

Former railway station in Ōfunato, Iwate Prefecture, Japan

Coordinates: 39°00′57″N 141°42′49″E

Hosoura 細浦
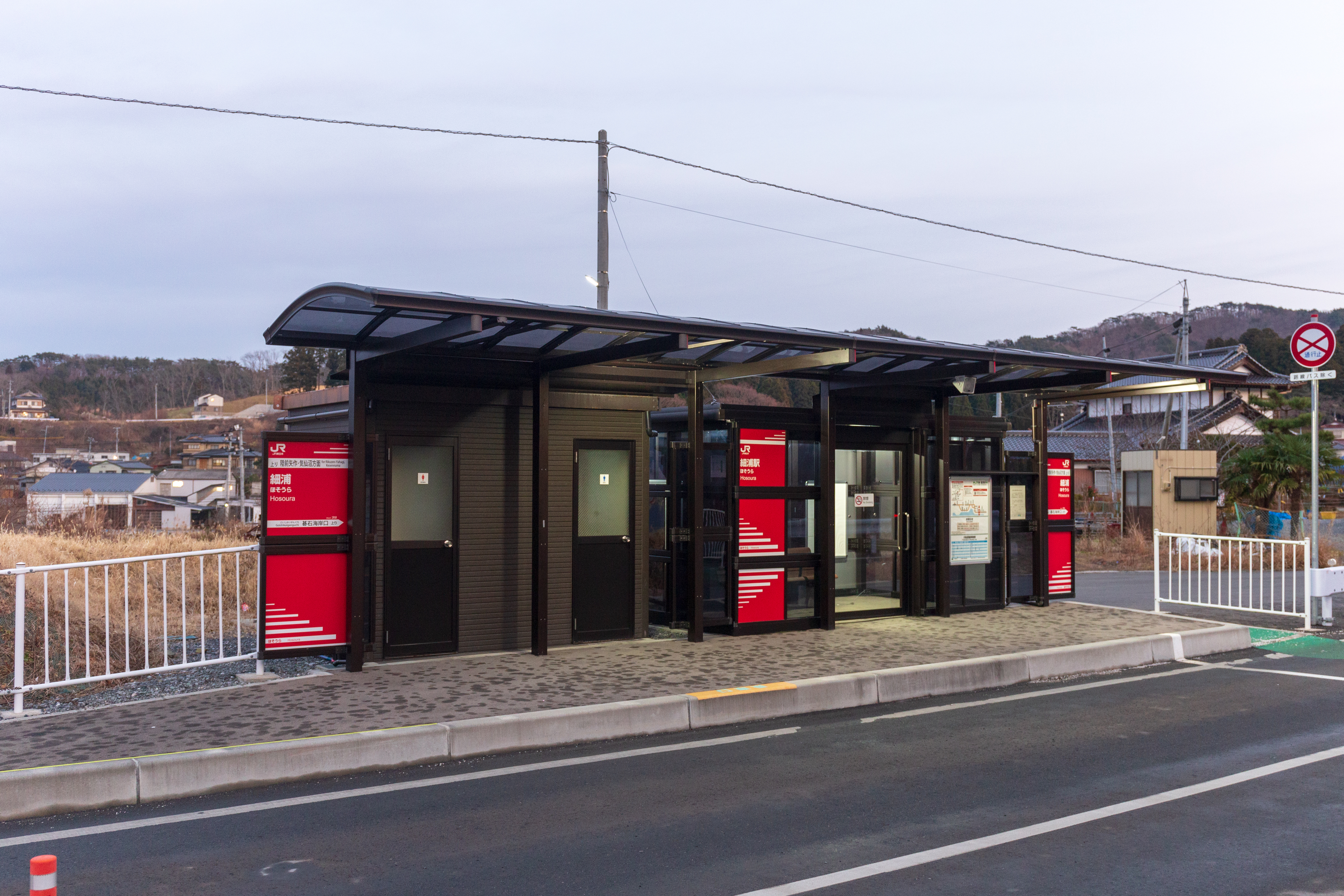
- Hosoura Station in December 2018

General information
- Location: Suezaki-cho Hosoura 77, Ōfunato, Iwate （岩手県大船渡市末崎町字細浦77） Japan
- Operator: JR East
- Line: Ōfunato Line

History
- Opened: 1933

Services
Preceding station	JR East	Following station
Goishi Kaiganguchi towards Maeyachi	Kesennuma / Ōfunato BRT	Ofunato Marumori towards Sakari

Former services
Preceding station	JR East	Following station
Otomo towards Ichinoseki	Ōfunato Line	Shimofunato towards Sakari
Location

Hosoura Station (細浦駅, Hosoura-eki) was a JR East railway station located in Ōfunato, Iwate Prefecture, Japan. The station, as well as most of the structures in the surrounding area, was destroyed by the 2011 Tōhoku earthquake and tsunami and has now been replaced by a provisional bus rapid transit line.

== Lines ==
Hosoura Station was served by the Ōfunato Line and was located 97.1 rail kilometers from the terminus of the line at Ichinoseki Station.

== Station layout ==
Hosoura Station had a single side platform serving traffic in both directions. The station was unattended.

== History ==
Hosoura Station opened on December 15, 1933. The station was absorbed into the JR East network upon the privatization of the Japan National Railways (JNR) on April 1, 1987. The station was one of six stations on the Ōfunato Line destroyed by the March 11, 2011 Tōhoku earthquake and tsunami.

== Surrounding area ==
- National Route 45
- Goishi Coast
- Hosoura Port
