= Wakinosawa Station =

Former railway station in Rikuzentakata, Iwate Prefecture, Japan

Wakinosawa Station 脇ノ沢駅
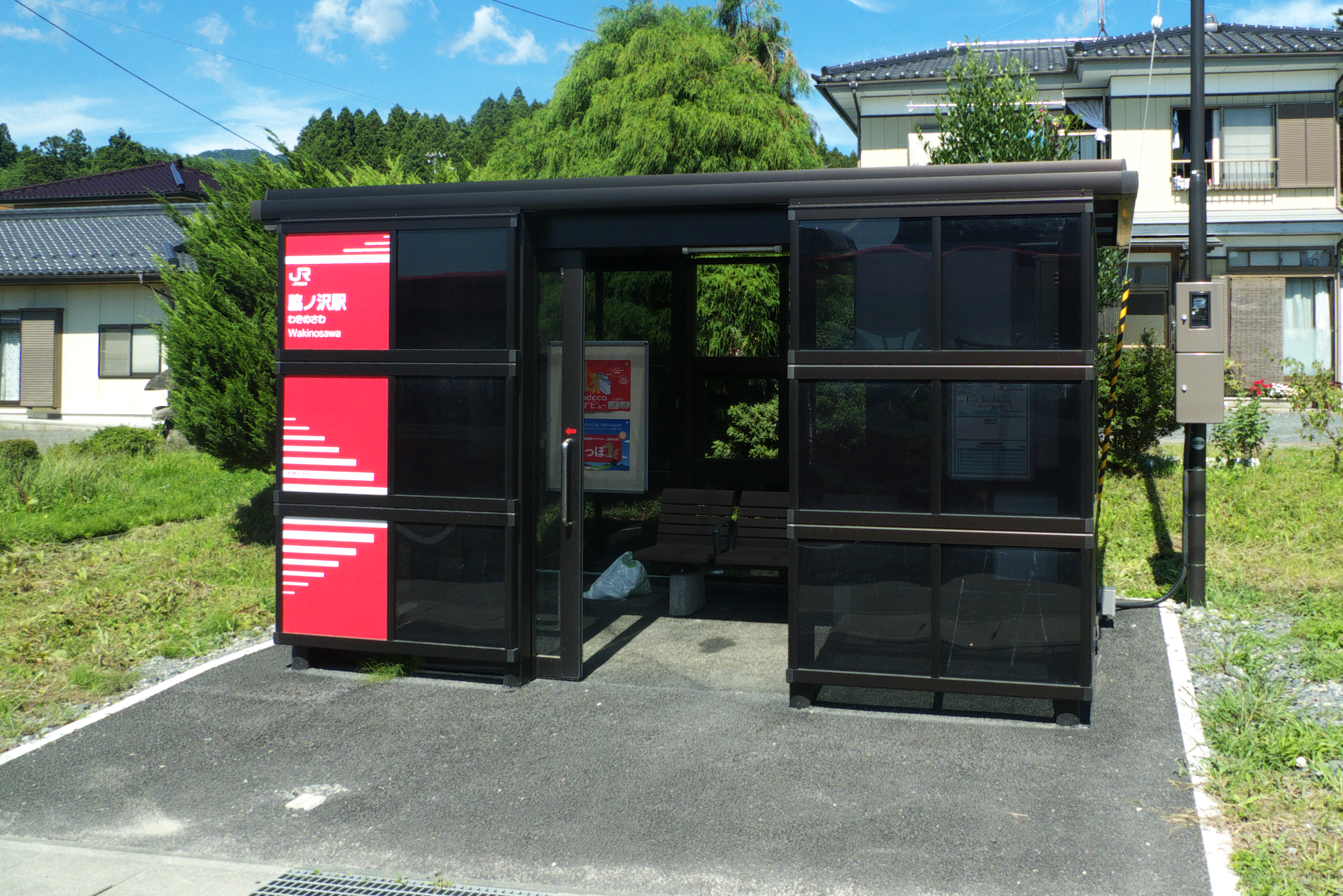
- Wakinosawa Station in September 2013

General information
- Location: Yonezaki-cho Wakinosawa 123, Rikuzentakata-shi, Iwate-ken 029-2206; Japan
- Coordinates: 39°00′24″N 141°39′26″E
- Operator: JR East
- Line: ■ Ōfunato Line
- Distance: 88.3 km from Ichinoseki
- Platforms: 1 side platform

Construction
- Structure type: At grade

Other information
- Status: Unstaffed
- Website: Official website

History
- Opened: 15 December 1933
- Closed: 11 March 2011

Passengers
- FY2015: 15 daily

Services
Preceding station	JR East	Following station
Takata Hospital towards Maeyachi	Kesennuma / Ōfunato BRT	Nishishita towards Sakari

Former services
Preceding station	JR East	Following station
Rikuzen-Takata towards Ichinoseki	Ōfunato Line	Otomo towards Sakari
Location
- Location within Japan

Wakinosawa Station (脇ノ沢駅, Wakinosawa-eki) was a JR East railway station located in Rikuzentakata, Iwate Prefecture, Japan. The station, as well as most of the structures in the surrounding area, was destroyed by the 2011 Tōhoku earthquake and tsunami and has now been replaced by a provisional bus rapid transit line.

== Lines ==
Wakinosawa Station was served by the Ōfunato Line, and is located 88.3 rail kilometers from the terminus of the line at Ichinoseki Station.

== Station layout ==
Wakinosawa Station had a single side platform, serving traffic in both directions. The station was unattended.

== History ==
Wakinosawa Station opened on 15 December 1933. On 23 May 1960, a tsunami caused by the Great Chilean earthquake submerged both this station and neighbouring Otomo Station, making the line temporarily impassable until the water is removed. The station was absorbed into the JR East network upon the privatization of the Japan National Railways (JNR) on April 1, 1987. The station was one of six stations on the Ōfunato Line destroyed by the 11 March 2011 Tōhoku earthquake and tsunami. Services have now been replaced by a BRT.

== Surrounding area ==
- Fumon-in temple

== See also ==
- List of railway stations in Japan
