= Niitsuki Station =

Railway station in Ichinoseki, Iwate Prefecture, Japan

Niitsuki Station 新月駅
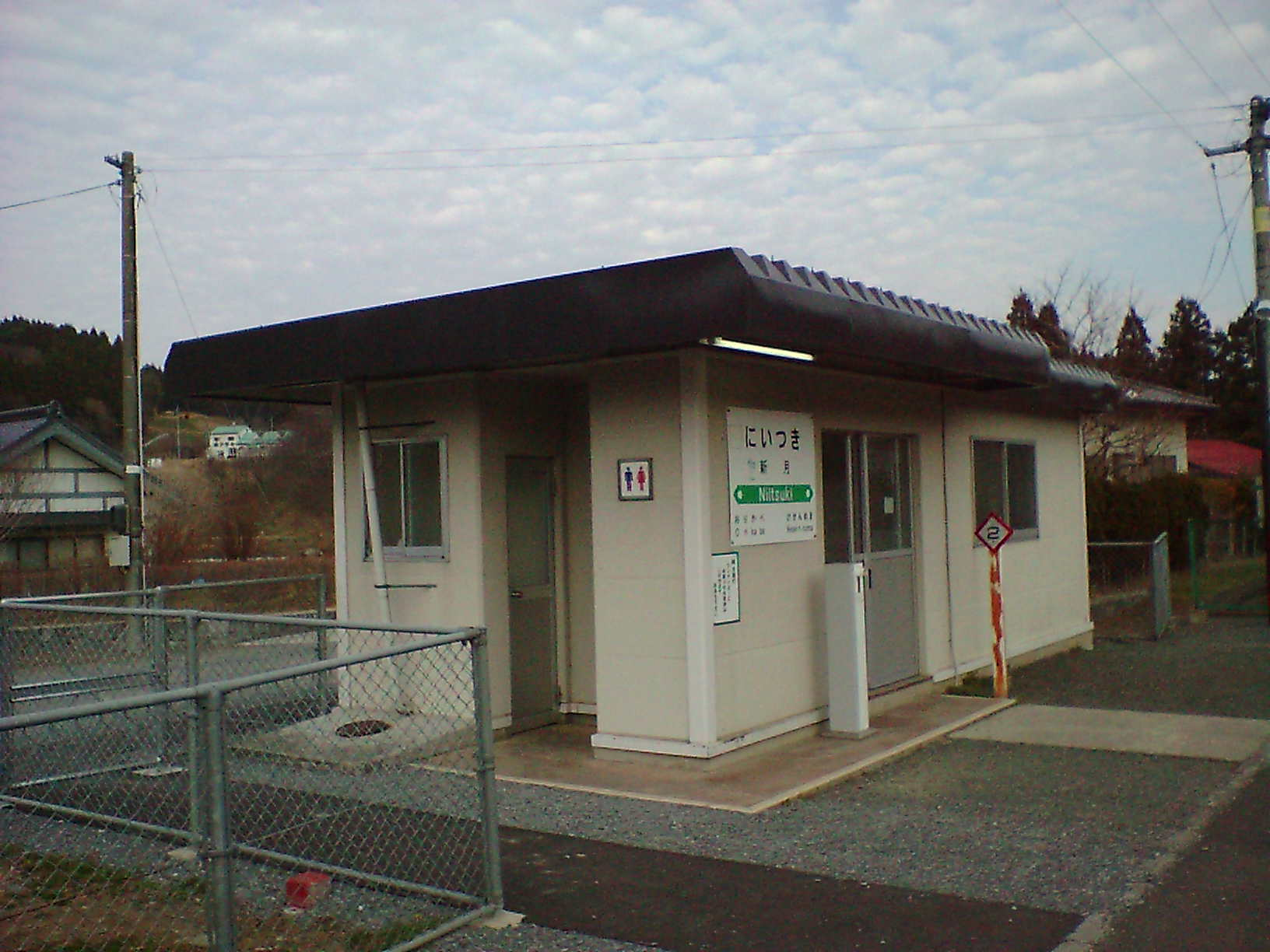
- Niitsuki Station in April 2005

General information
- Location: Murone-cho Orikabe-aze, Ichinoseki-shi, Iwate-ken 029-1201; Japan
- Coordinates: 38.9157°N 141.4889°E
- Operator: JR East
- Line: ■ Ōfunato Line
- Distance: 55.3 km from Ichinoseki
- Platforms: 1 side platform

Other information
- Status: Unstaffed
- Website: Official website

History
- Opened: July 31, 1929

Services
Preceding station	JR East	Following station
Orikabe towards Ichinoseki	Ōfunato Line	Kesennuma Terminus
Location
- Location within Iwate Prefecture Location within Japan

Niitsuki Station (新月駅, Niitsuki-eki) is a railway station located in the city of Ichinoseki, Iwate Prefecture, Japan, operated by the East Japan Railway Company (JR East).

== History ==
Niitsuki Station opened on July 31, 1929. The station was absorbed into the JR East network upon the privatization of the Japan National Railways (JNR) on April 1, 1987.

== Lines ==
The station is served by the Ōfunato Line, and is located 55.3 rail kilometers from the terminus of the line at Ichinoseki Station.

== Station layout ==
Niitsuki Station has one ground-level side platform serving a single bi-directional track. The station is unattended.

== Surrounding area ==
- National Route 284]
- Iwate-Miyagi prefectural border

== See also ==
- List of railway stations in Japan
