= Shimofunato Station =

Former railway station in Ōfunato, Iwate Prefecture, Japan

Coordinates: 39°02′18″N 141°43′16″E

Shimofunato 下船渡
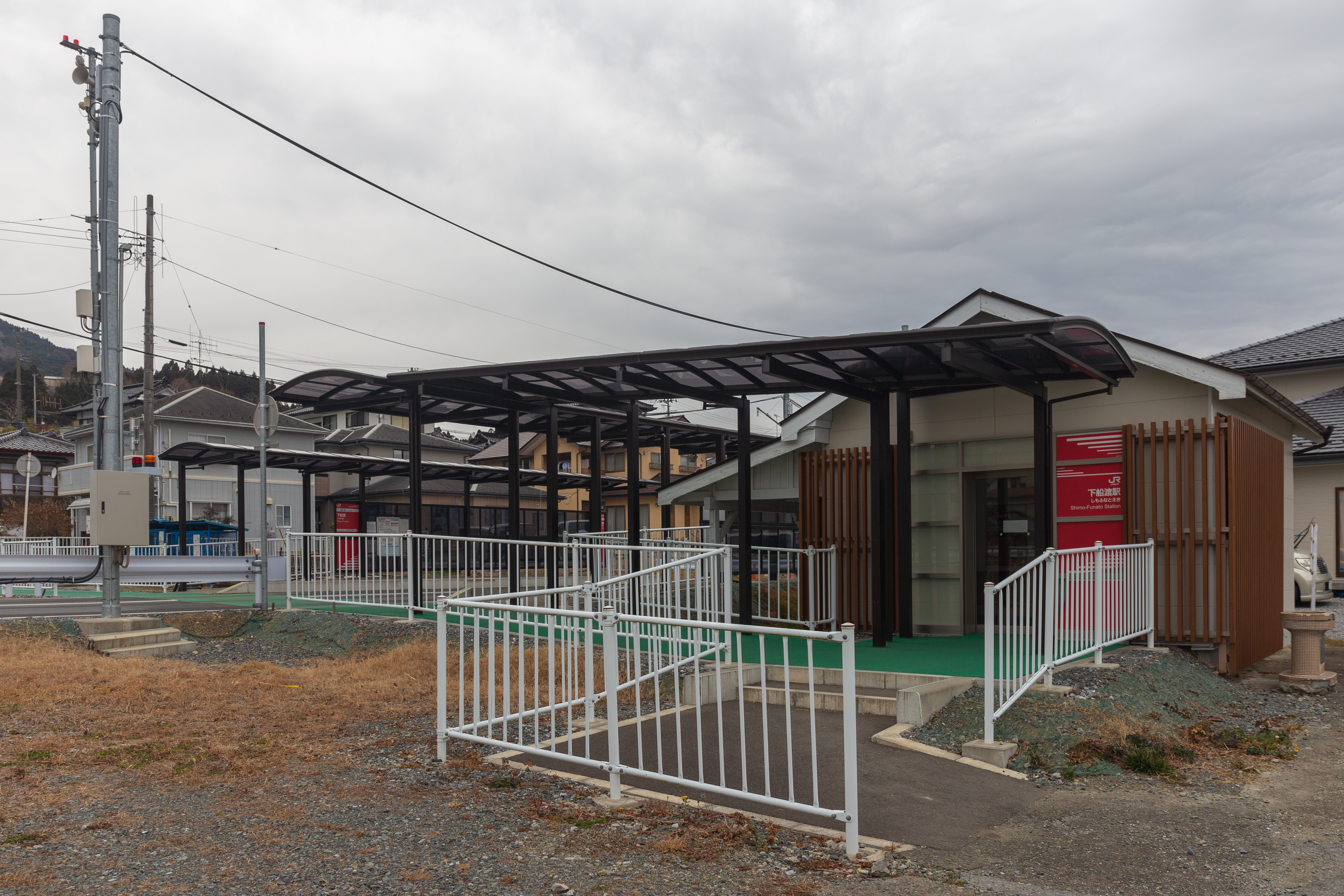
- Shimofunato Station in December 2018

General information
- Location: Ōfunato-cho Miya-no-mae 66, Ōfunato, Iwate （岩手県大船渡市大船渡町字宮ノ前66） Japan
- Operator: JR East
- Line: Ōfunato Line

History
- Opened: 1934

Services
| Preceding station | JR East | Following station |
|---|---|---|
| Ofunato-Marumori towards Maeyachi | Kesennuma / Ōfunato BRT | Ofunato Fish Market towards Sakari |

Former services
| Preceding station | JR East | Following station |
|---|---|---|
| Hosoura towards Ichinoseki | Ōfunato Line | Ōfunato towards Sakari |
Location

Shimofunato Station (下船渡駅, Shimofunato-eki) was a JR East railway station located in Ōfunato, Iwate Prefecture, Japan. The station was closed after the 2011 Tōhoku earthquake and tsunami and has now been replaced by a provisional bus rapid transit line.

== Lines ==
Shimofunato Station was served by the Ōfunato Line, and was located 100.2 rail kilometers from the terminus of the line at Ichinoseki Station.

== Station layout ==
Shimofunato Station had a single side platform serving traffic in both directions. The station was unattended.

== History ==
Shimofunato Station opened on 3 September 1934. The station was absorbed into the JR East network upon the privatization of the Japan National Railways (JNR) on April 1, 1987. The station was closed after the 11 March 2011 Tōhoku earthquake and tsunami.

== Surrounding area ==
- National Route 45
- Shimofunato Shell Mound (National Historic Site)
