= Mataki Station =

Railway station in Ichinoseki, Iwate Prefecture, Japan

Mataki Station 真滝駅
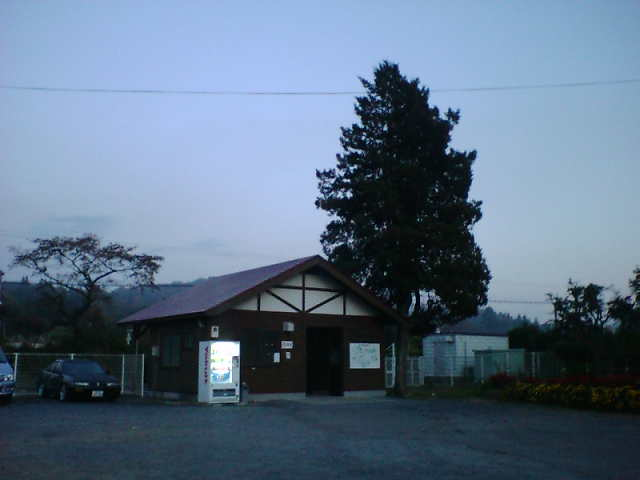
- Mataki Station

General information
- Location: Takizawa, Ichinoseki-shi, Iwate-ken 029-0132; Japan
- Coordinates: 38.9083°N 141.1781°E
- Operator: JR East
- Line: ■ Ōfunato Line
- Distance: 5.7 km from Ichinoseki
- Platforms: 2 side platforms

Other information
- Status: Unstaffed
- Website: Official website

History
- Opened: July 26, 1925

Services
Preceding station	JR East	Following station
Ichinoseki Terminus	Ōfunato Line	Rikuchū-Kanzaki towards Kesennuma
Location
- Location within Iwate Prefecture Location within Japan

Mataki Station (真滝駅, Mataki-eki) is a railway station located in the city of Ichinoseki, Iwate Prefecture, Japan, operated by the East Japan Railway Company (JR East).

== Lines ==
Mataki Station is served by the Ōfunato Line, and is located 5.7 rail kilometers from the terminus of the line at Ichinoseki Station.

== Station layout ==
The station has two opposed unnumbered side platforms connected to the station building by a level crossing. The station is unattended.

=== Platforms ===
station side	■ Ōfunato Line	for Ichinoseki
opposite side	■ Ōfunato Line	for Kesennuma

== History ==
Matagi Station opened on July 26, 1925. The station was absorbed into the JR East network upon the privatization of the Japan National Railways (JNR) on April 1, 1987. A new station building was completed in January 1998.

== Surrounding area ==
- National Route 284
- Mataki Junior High School
- Takizawa Elementary School

== See also ==
- List of railway stations in Japan
