= Ōfunato Station =

Former railway station in Ōfunato, Iwate Prefecture, Japan

Coordinates: 39°03′47″N 141°43′14″E

Ōfunato 大船渡
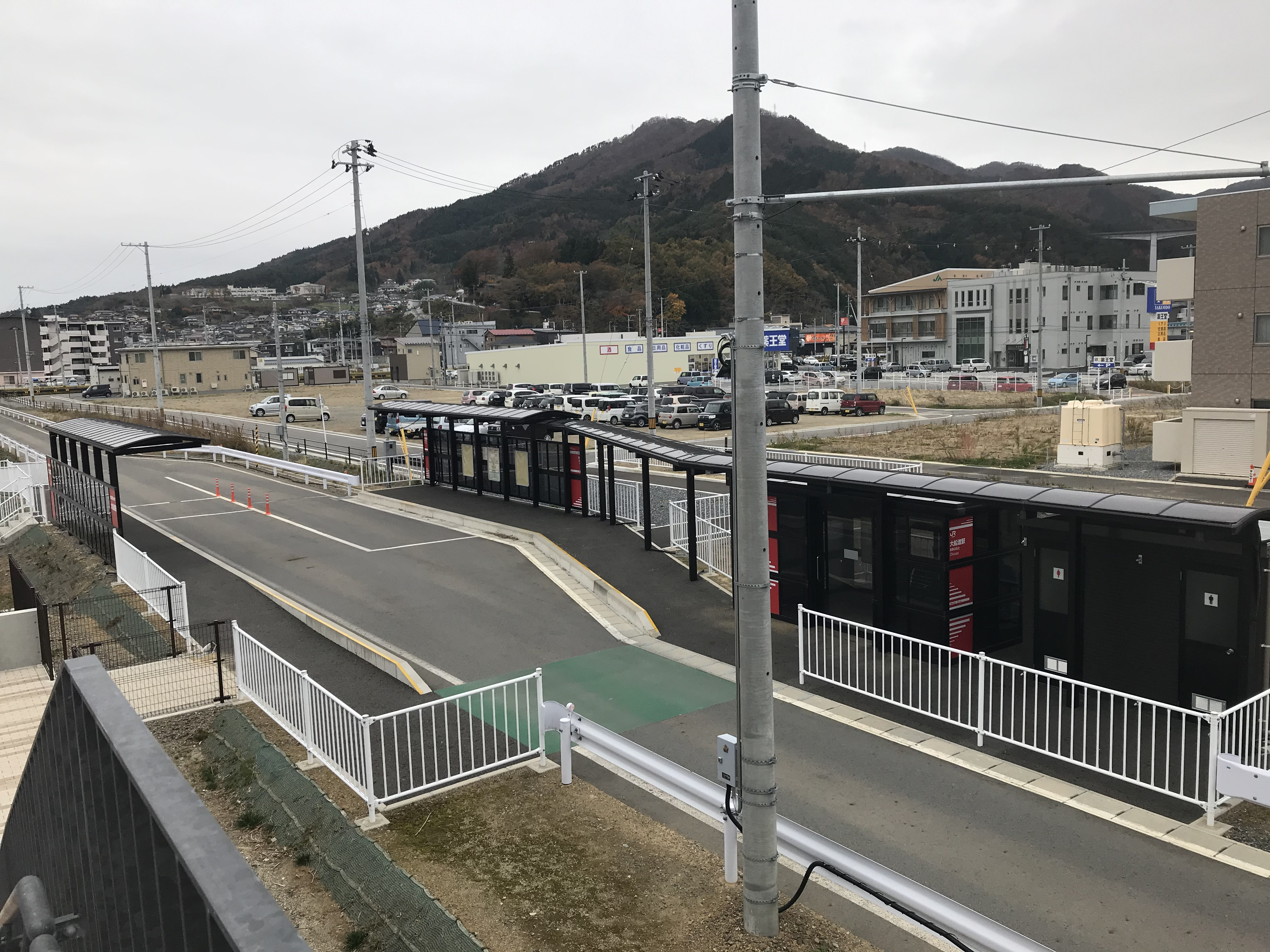
- Ōfunato Station in November 2019

General information
- Location: Ōfunato-cho Chaya-mae 69-1, Ōfunato, Iwate （岩手県大船渡市大船渡町字茶屋前69-1） Japan
- Operator: JR East
- Line: Ōfunato Line

History
- Opened: 1934

Services
Preceding station	JR East	Following station
Ofunato Fish Market towards Maeyachi	Kesennuma / Ōfunato BRT	Chinomori towards Sakari

Former services
Preceding station	JR East	Following station
Shimofunato towards Ichinoseki	Ōfunato Line	Sakari Terminus
Location

Ōfunato Station (大船渡駅, Ōfunato-eki) was a JR East railway station located in Ōfunato, Iwate Prefecture, Japan. The station was destroyed by the 2011 Tōhoku earthquake and tsunami and has now been replaced by a provisional bus rapid transit line.

== Lines ==
Ōfunato Station was served by the Ōfunato Line, and was located 103.1 rail kilometers from the terminus of the line at Ichinoseki Station.

== Station layout ==
Ōfunato Station had a single side platform serving traffic in both directions.

== History ==
Ōfunato Station opened on 3 September 1934. The station was absorbed into the JR East network upon the privatization of the Japan National Railways (JNR) on April 1, 1987. The station was destroyed by the 11 March 2011 Tōhoku earthquake and tsunami.

== Surrounding area ==
- National Route 45
- Ōfunato Port
