= Ōfunato Line =

Railway line in Japan

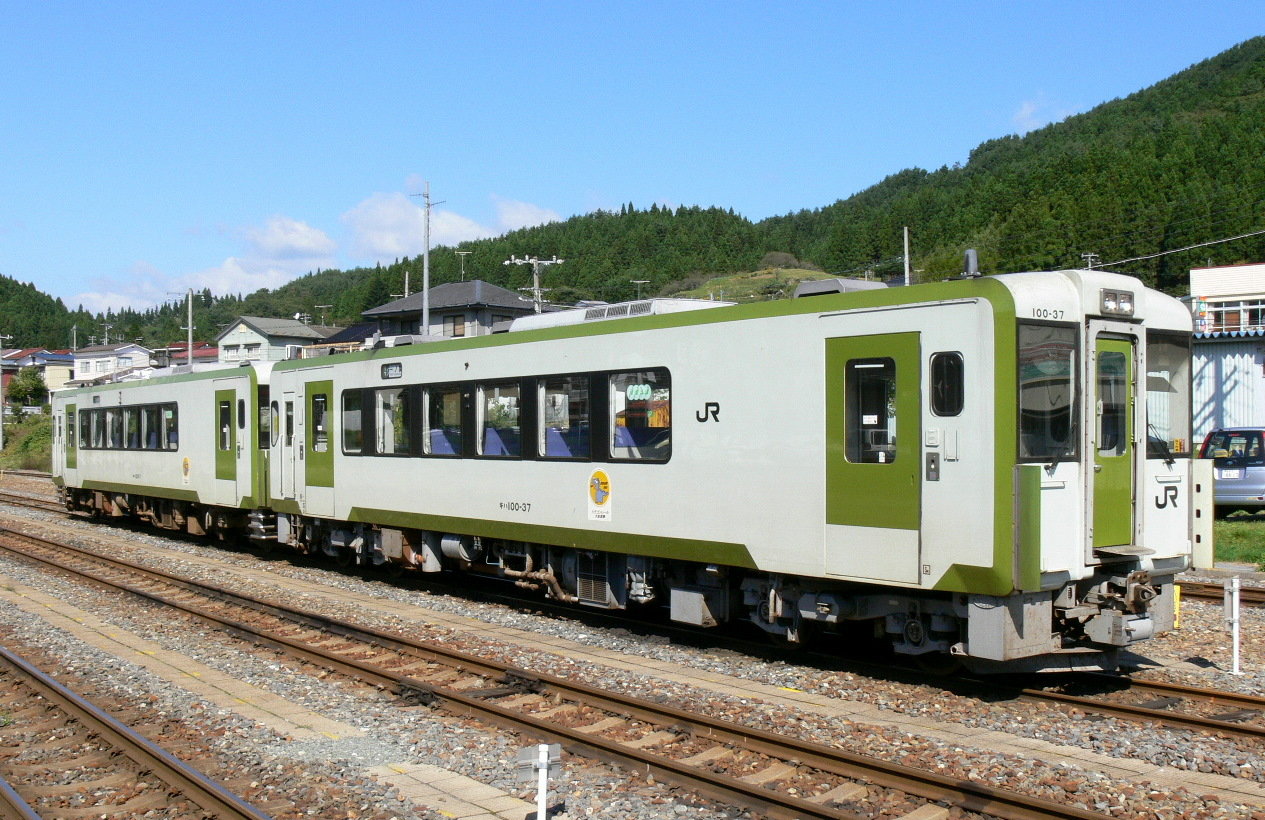
- KiHa 100 DMU at Kesennuma Station, October 2006

Overview
- Native name: 大船渡線
- Status: In operation (Ichinoseki – Kesennuma as a railway) (Kesennuma – Sakari as a BRT route)
- Owner: JR East
- Locale: Iwate Prefecture
- Termini: Ichinoseki Station; Sakari Station
- Stations: 25 (14 are railway stations following the 2011 disaster)

Service
- Type: Heavy rail
- Operator: JR East
- Rolling stock: KiHa 100 series DMU, Hino Blue Ribbon City Bus, Isuzu Erga Bus

History
- Opened: 26 July 1925
- Closed: 1 April 2020 (Section between Kesennuma – Sakari was replaced by bus rapid transit in 2013 but was only formally closed in 2020)

Technical
- Line length: 105.7 km (65.7 mi) (Until 2011); 62.0 km (38.5 mi) (After 2011)
- Number of tracks: Entire line single tracked
- Character: Rural
- Track gauge: 1,067 mm (3 ft 6 in)
- Electrification: Not electrified
- Operating speed: 85 km/h (53 mph)
Route map

The Ōfunato Line (大船渡線, Ōfunato-sen) is a local railway line in Iwate Prefecture, Japan, operated by the East Japan Railway Company (JR East). It originally connected Ichinoseki Station in Ichinoseki to Sakari Station in Ōfunato, on the Tohoku coast.

The eastern section of the line was significantly damaged by the 2011 Tōhoku earthquake and tsunami on 11 March 2011. In January 2012, services resumed on the western 62.0 km (38.5 mi) portion of the route between Ichinoseki and Kesennuma. The eastern section between Kesennuma and Sakari remains closed, and in February 2012, JR East officially proposed that this section of the line be scrapped and the right-of-way used as a bus rapid transit (BRT) route. The section was routinely replaced by BRT, and this section of the line was formally closed as a railway on 1 April 2020.

The line connects with the Kesennuma Line at Kesennuma Station and formerly connected with the privately owned Sanriku Railway's Minami-Riasu Line at Sakari Station in Ōfunato.

== History ==
The Ichinoseki – Kesennuma section opened in stages between 1925 and 1929, with the Kesennuma – Sakari section opening between 1932 and 1935.

Freight services ceased in 1983/4.

Following the 2011 disaster, services resumed on the Ichinoseki – Kesennuma section on 1 April, but were suspended again between 7–18 April due to aftershocks.

The first section of the busway replacing the Kesennuma – Sakari section opened in March 2013.

== Operations ==
In April 2005, there were 27 services daily using this line (14 eastbound, 13 westbound).

Following the 2011 disaster, operations were reduced to ten eastbound local trains and one Super Dragon rapid service, with westbound services consisting of nine local trains and one rapid. In March 2013 the rapid services were withdrawn.

On 22 December 2012, a special Pokémon With You train began running on the line. The train operates on selected days, departing eastbound at 11:01am and returning westbound at 2:37pm. The train stops at most stations on the way for between six and thirteen minutes. All seats are reserved and a seat fee is payable in addition to the basic fare.

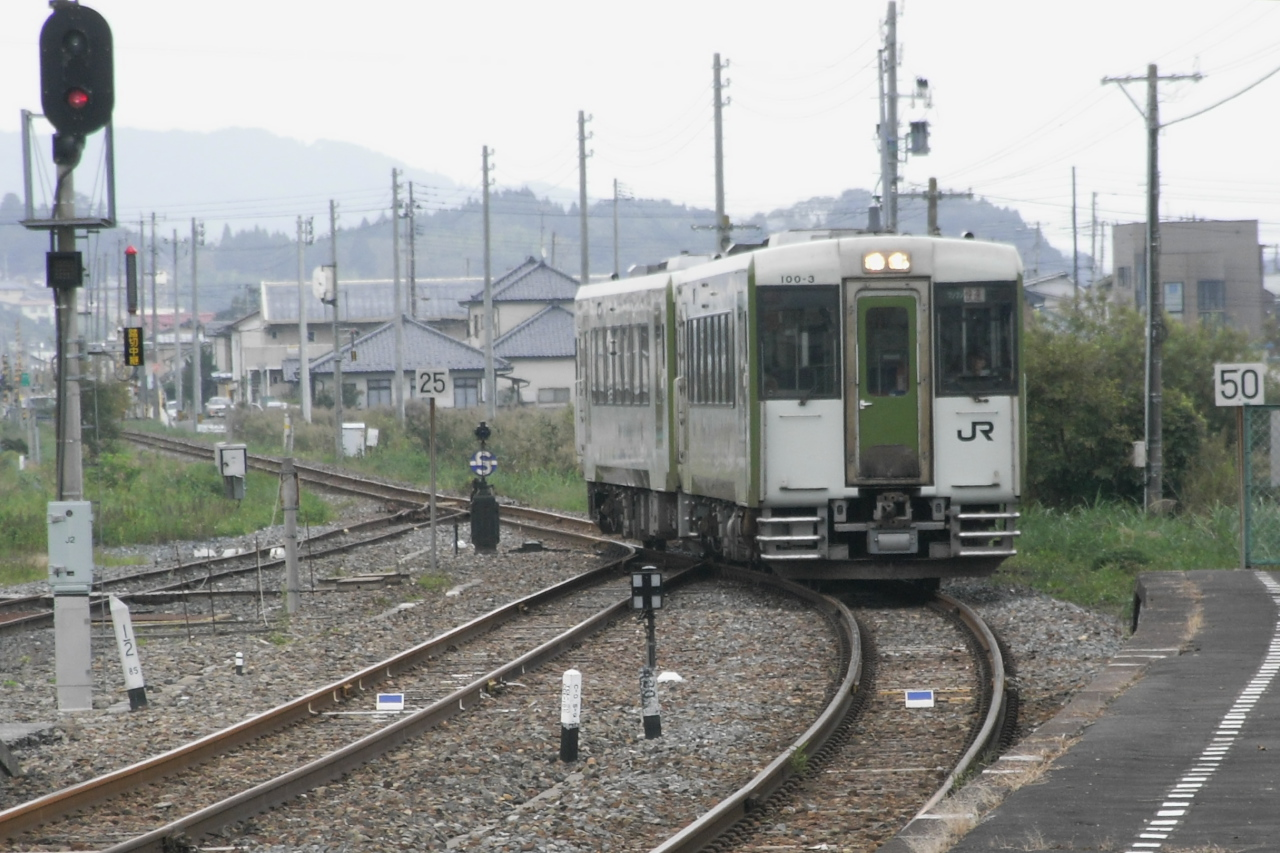
KiHa 100 series diesel multiple unit

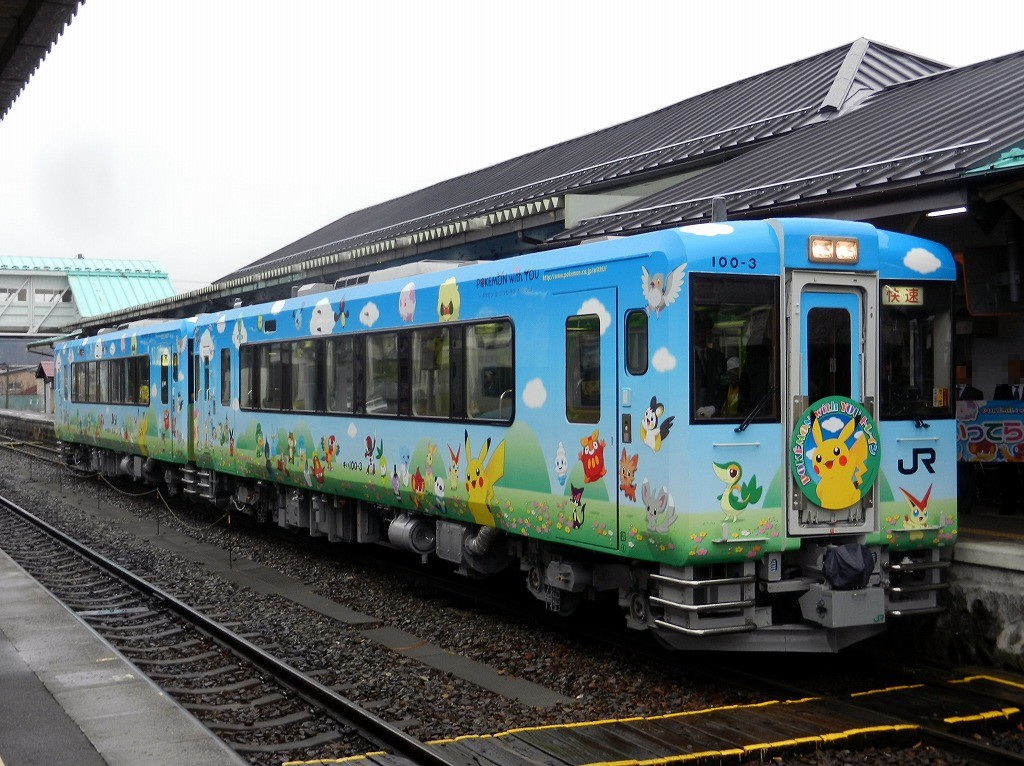
Pokémon With You Train

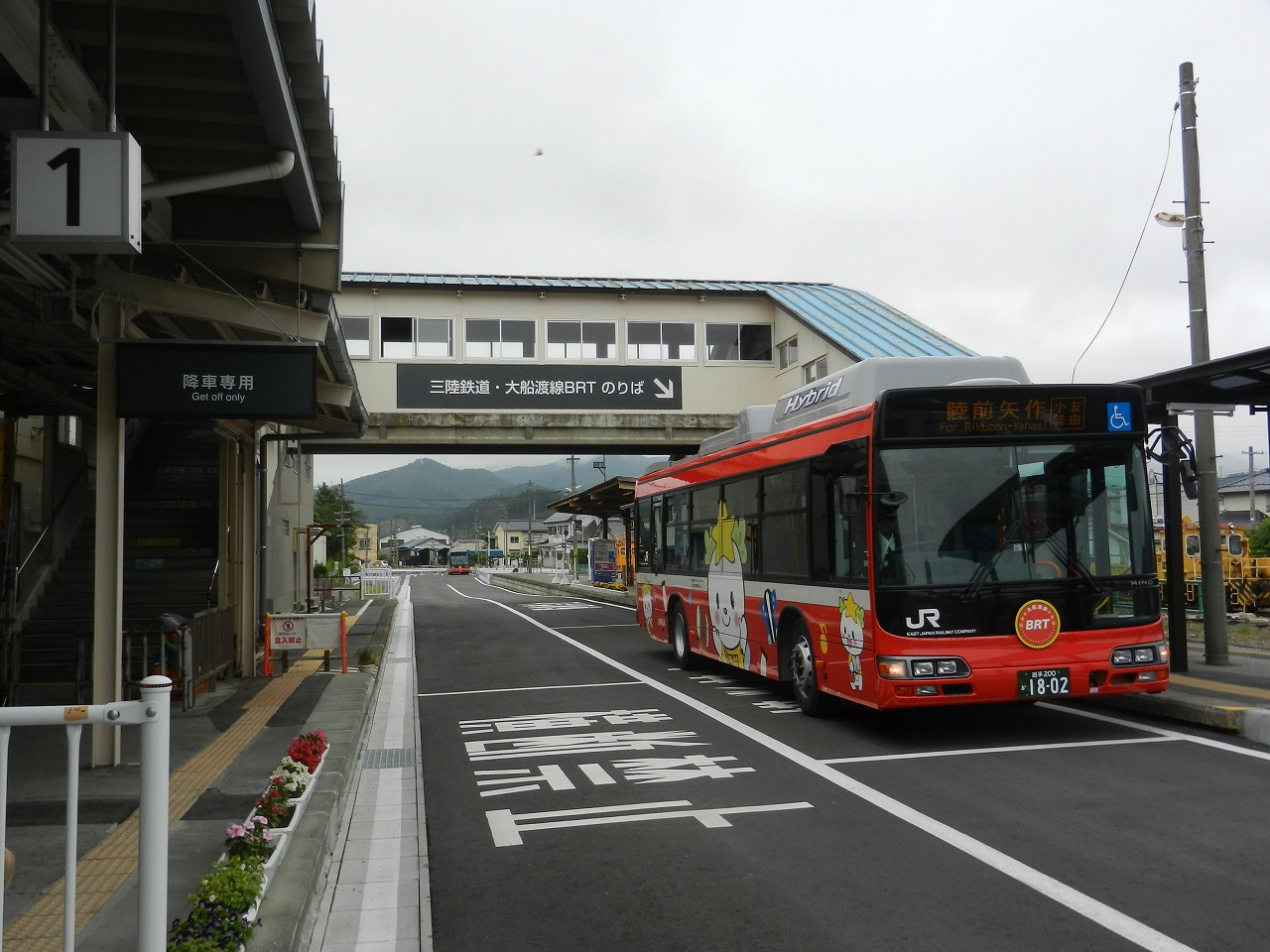
Hino Blue Ribbon City bus used on BRT services

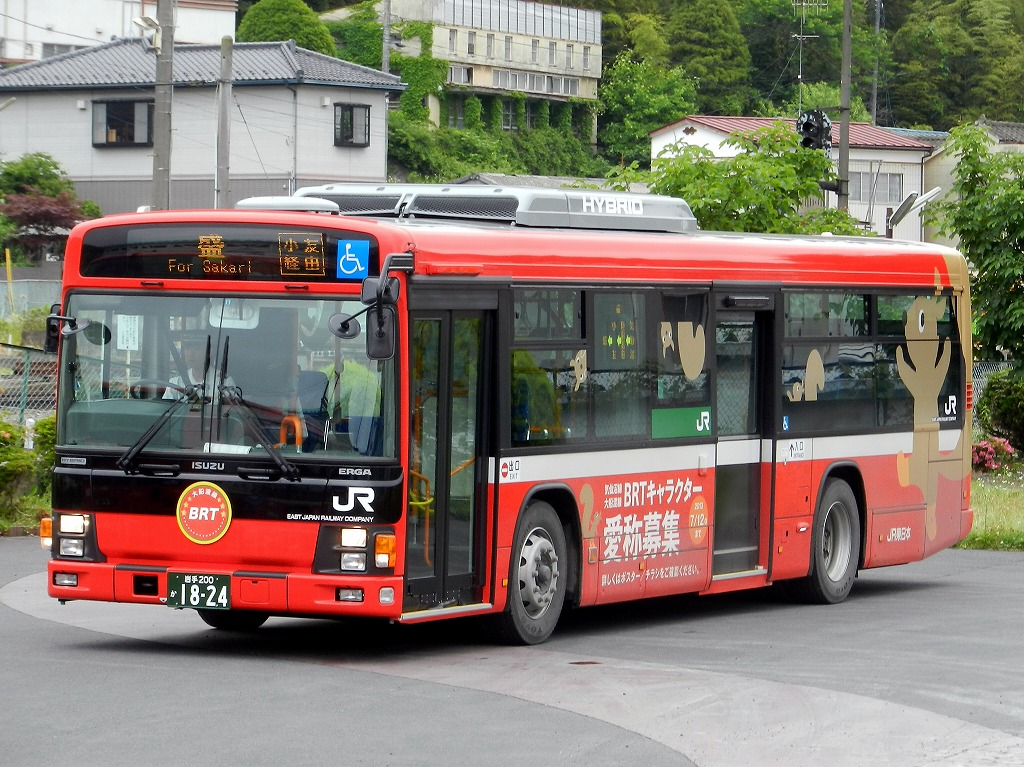
Isuzu Erga bus used on BRT services

== Station list ==
Stations in greyed out cells have been closed since the 2011 Tōhoku earthquake and tsunami.

Station name	Japanese	Distance (km) from		Local train	BRT	Connections	Location
Station name	Japanese	previous station	Ichinoseki	Local train	BRT	Connections	Location
Ichinoseki	一ノ関	–	0.0	●	Local buses	■ Tōhoku Main Line; Tōhoku Shinkansen	Ichinoseki, Iwate
Mataki	真滝	5.7	5.7	●	Local buses		Ichinoseki, Iwate
Rikuchū-Kanzaki	陸中門崎	8.0	13.7	●	Local buses		Ichinoseki, Iwate
Iwanoshita	岩ノ下	3.8	17.5	●	Local buses		Ichinoseki, Iwate
Rikuchū-Matsukawa	陸中松川	3.8	21.3	●	Local buses		Ichinoseki, Iwate
Geibikei	猊鼻渓	2.0	23.3	●	Local buses		Ichinoseki, Iwate
Shibajuku	柴宿	2.8	26.1	●	Local buses		Ichinoseki, Iwate
Surisawa	摺沢	4.5	30.6	●	Local buses		Ichinoseki, Iwate
Senmaya	千厩	9.2	39.8	●	Local buses		Ichinoseki, Iwate
Konashi	小梨	3.6	43.4	●	Local buses		Ichinoseki, Iwate
Yagoshi	矢越	4.2	47.6	●	Local buses		Ichinoseki, Iwate
Orikabe	折壁	2.1	49.7	●	Local buses		Ichinoseki, Iwate
Niitsuki	新月	5.6	55.3	●	Local buses		Ichinoseki, Iwate
Kesennuma	気仙沼	6.7	62.0	●	●	■ Kesennuma Line	Kesennuma, Miyagi
Shishiorikarakuwa	鹿折唐桑	2.2	64.2	No service	●		Kesennuma, Miyagi
Kami-Shishiori	上鹿折	5.3	69.5	No service	Local buses		Kesennuma, Miyagi
Rikuzen-Yahagi	陸前矢作	10.0	79.5	No service	●		Rikuzen-Takata, Iwate
Takekoma	竹駒	3.0	82.5	No service	●		Rikuzen-Takata, Iwate
Rikuzen-Takata	陸前高田	2.9	85.4	No service	●		Rikuzen-Takata, Iwate
Wakinosawa	脇ノ沢	2.9	88.3	No service	●		Rikuzen-Takata, Iwate
Otomo	小友	4.5	92.8	No service	●		Rikuzen-Takata, Iwate
Hosoura	細浦	4.3	97.1	No service	●		Ōfunato, Iwate
Shimofunato	下船渡	3.1	100.2	No service	●		Ōfunato, Iwate
Ōfunato	大船渡	2.9	103.1	No service	●		Ōfunato, Iwate
Sakari	盛	2.6	105.7	No service	●	■ Sanriku Railway Rias Line	Ōfunato, Iwate
