= Kesennuma Station =

Railway station in Kesennuma, Miyagi Prefecture, Japan

Kesennuma Station 気仙沼駅
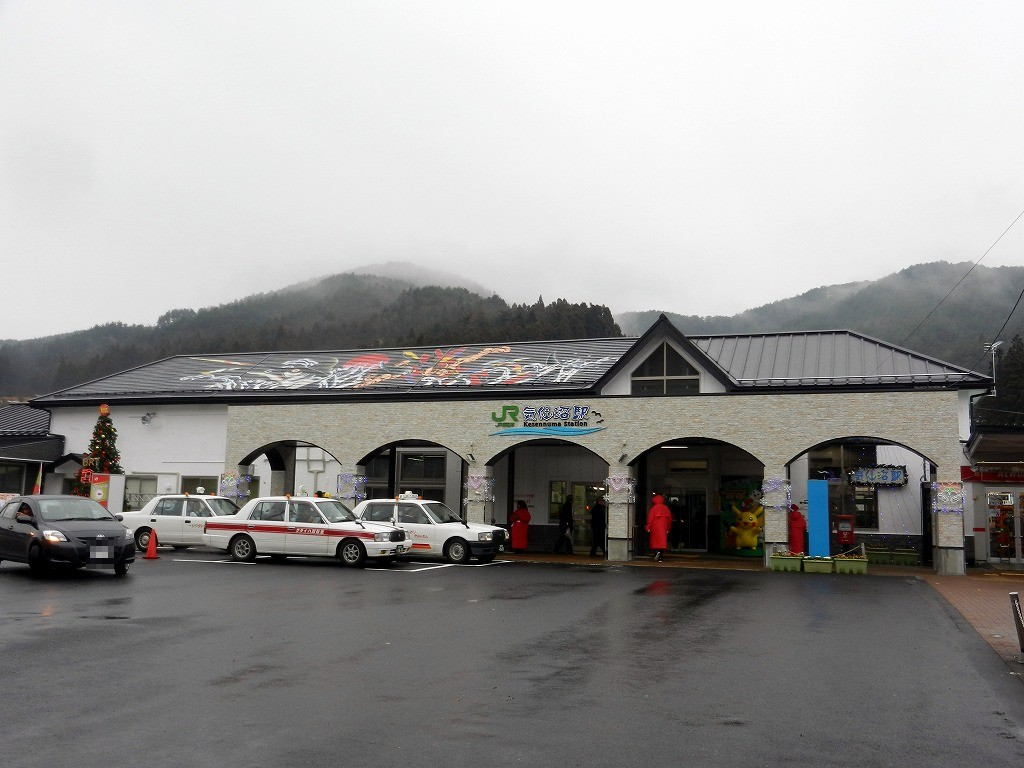
- Kesennuma Station in December 2012

General information
- Location: 1-5-25 Furumachi, Kesennuma-shi, Miyagi-ken 988-0077; Japan
- Coordinates: 38°54′36″N 141°33′32″E
- Operator: JR East
- Lines: ■ Kesennuma Line; ■ Ōfunato Line
- Platforms: 1 side + 1 island platforms

Other information
- Status: Staffed (Midori no Madoguchi)
- Website: Official website

History
- Opened: 31 July 1929

Passengers
- FY2018: 196 daily

Services
Preceding station	JR East	Following station
Niitsuki towards Ichinoseki	Ōfunato Line	Terminus
Higashi Shinjo towards Maeyachi	Kesennuma / Ōfunato BRT	Naiwan-Iriguchi (Yōkamachi) towards Sakari

Former services
Preceding station	JR East	Following station
Niitsuki towards Ichinoseki	Ōfunato Line	Shishiorikarakuwa towards Sakari
Fudōnosawa towards Kogota	Kesennuma Line	Terminus
Location
- Location within Iwate Prefecture Location within Japan

Kesennuma Station (気仙沼駅, Kesennuma-eki) is a junction railway station located in the city of Kesennuma, Miyagi, Japan, operated by the East Japan Railway Company (JR East).

== Lines ==
Kesennuma Station was a junction station served by the Ōfunato Line and the Kesennuma Line. The station is 62.0 kilometers from Ichinoseki and 72.8 kilometers from Maeyachi. Since the March 2011 Tōhoku earthquake and tsunami, services on the Kesennuma Line between Kesennuma and Yanaizu have been suspended, and services replaced by a provisional bus rapid transit line. The Ōfunato Line still serves Kesennuma from its terminal at Ichinoseki; however services past Kesennuma have likewise been suspended and replaced by a Bus Rapid Transit Line.

== Station layout ==
The station has a single side platform and an island platform connected to the station building by a footbridge. The station has a Midori no Madoguchi staffed ticket office.

=== Platforms ===
1	■ Kesennuma Line BRT	for Yanaizu
2	■ Kesennuma Line BRT	siding
3	■ Ōfunato Line	for Ichinoseki

== History ==
Kesennuma Station opened on 31 July 1929 on the Ōfunato Line. Passenger services on the Kesennuma Line began on 11 February 1957. The station was absorbed into the JR East network upon the privatization of the Japanese National Railways (JNR) on April 1, 1987. Since the March 2011 Tōhoku earthquake and tsunami, the station has become the de facto terminal station of the Ōfunato Line, with services beyond the station replaced by a provisional bus rapid transit line. Services on the Kesennuma Line have also been suspended and replaced by a bus line.

== Passenger statistics ==
In fiscal 2018, the station was used by an average of 196 passengers daily (boarding passengers only).

== Surrounding area ==
- National Route 284
- Kesennuma Furumachi post office
- Kesennuma tax office

== See also ==
- List of railway stations in Japan
