= Ichinoseki Station =

Railway station in Ichinoseki, Iwate Prefecture, Japan

Ichinoseki Station 一ノ関駅
- Ichinoseki Station in October, 2026

General information
- Location: 67-1 Ekimae, Ichinoseki-shi, Iwate-ken 021-0867; Japan
- Coordinates: 38.926531°N 141.138697°E
- Operator: JR East
- Lines: Tōhoku Shinkansen; Tōhoku Main Line; Ōfunato Line
- Distance: 445.1 km (276.6 mi) from Tokyo
- Platforms: 3 side + 1 island platforms
- Tracks: 5

Other information
- Status: Staffed (Midori no Madoguchi)
- Website: Official website

History
- Opened: 16 April 1890; 136 years ago

Passengers
- FY2018: 4,398 daily

Services
Preceding station	JR East	Following station
Kurikoma-Kōgen towards Tokyo	Tōhoku Shinkansen Hayabusa	Mizusawa-Esashi towards Shin-Aomori
Kurikoma-Kōgen towards Tokyo	Tōhoku Shinkansen Yamabiko	Mizusawa-Esashi towards Morioka
Arikabe towards Kuroiso	Tōhoku Main Line Local	Yamanome towards Morioka
Terminus	Ōfunato Line	Mataki towards Kesennuma
Location
- Location within Iwate Prefecture Location within Japan

Ichinoseki Station (一ノ関駅, Ichinoseki-eki) is a junction railway station in the city of Ichinoseki, Iwate, Japan, operated by East Japan Railway Company (JR East).

== Lines ==
Ichinoseki Station is served by the Tōhoku Shinkansen, Tōhoku Main Line and is a terminal station for the Ōfunato Line. It is 445.1 kilometers from the starting point of the Tōhoku Shinkansen and Tōhoku Main Line at Tokyo.

== Station layout ==
The station has a single side platform and an island platform serving the Tōhoku Main Line and Ōfunato Line, and a pair of elevated opposed side platforms for the Tōhoku Shinkansen. The station has a Midori no Madoguchi staffed ticket office.

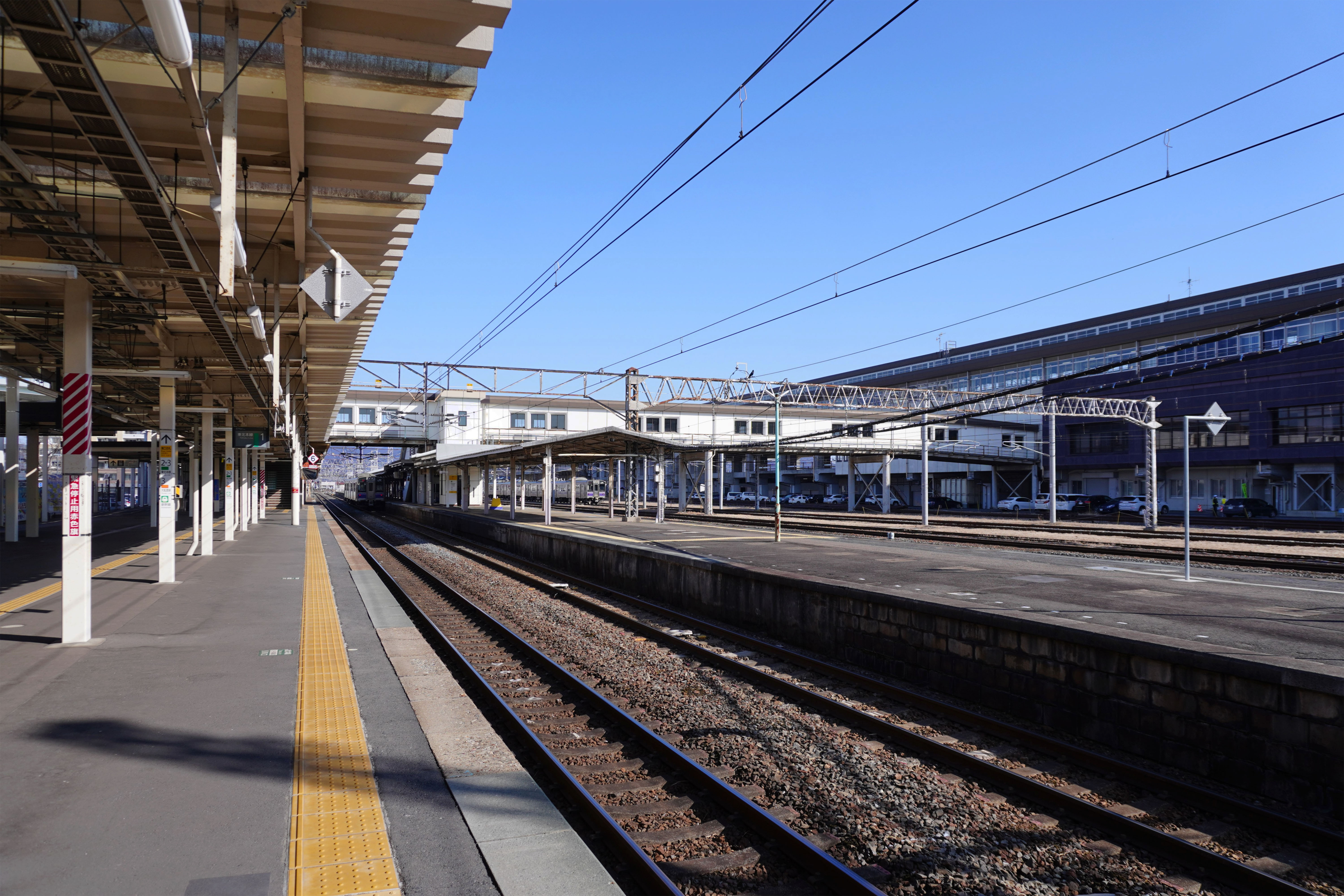
Tōhoku Main Line Platform

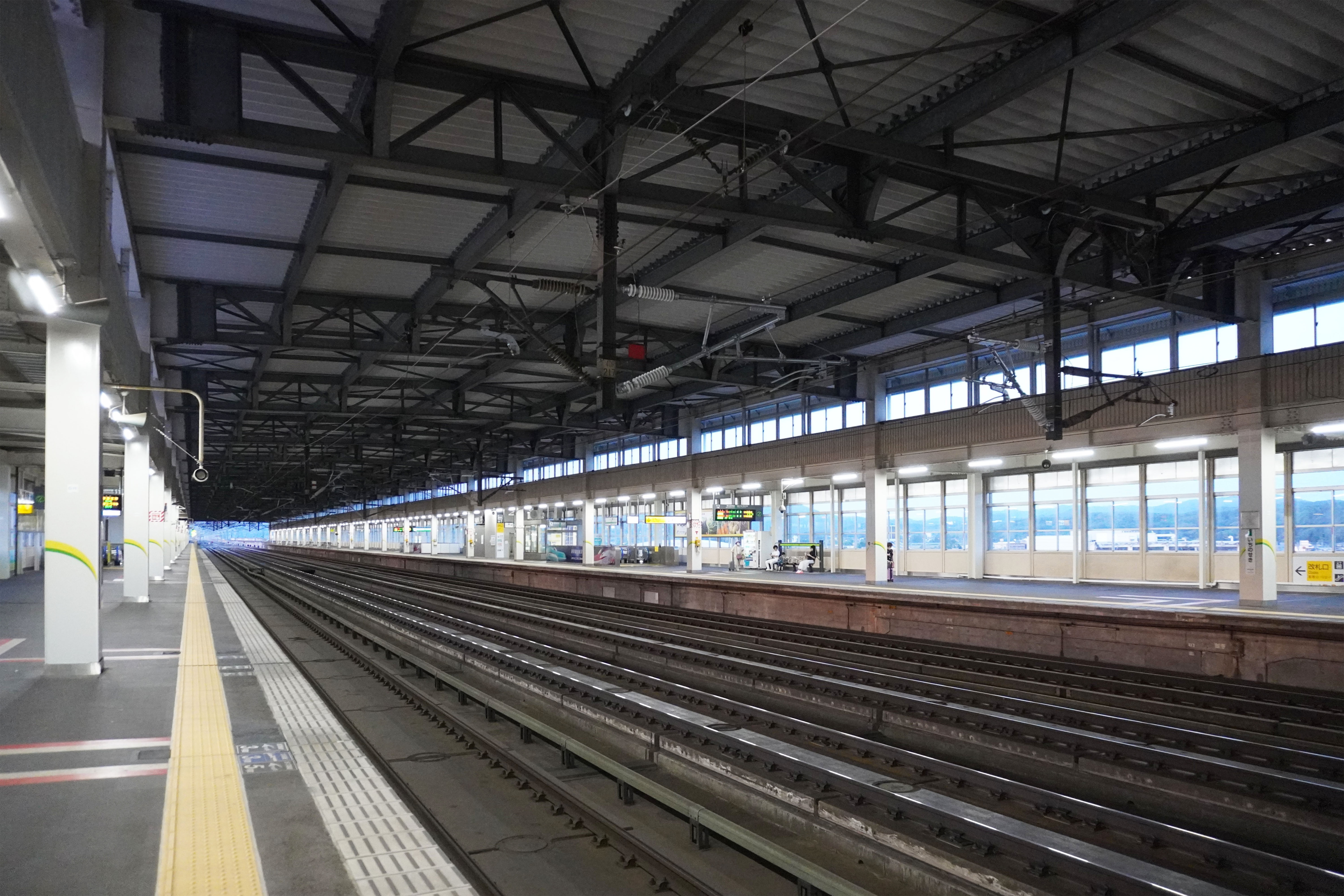
Shinkansen Platform

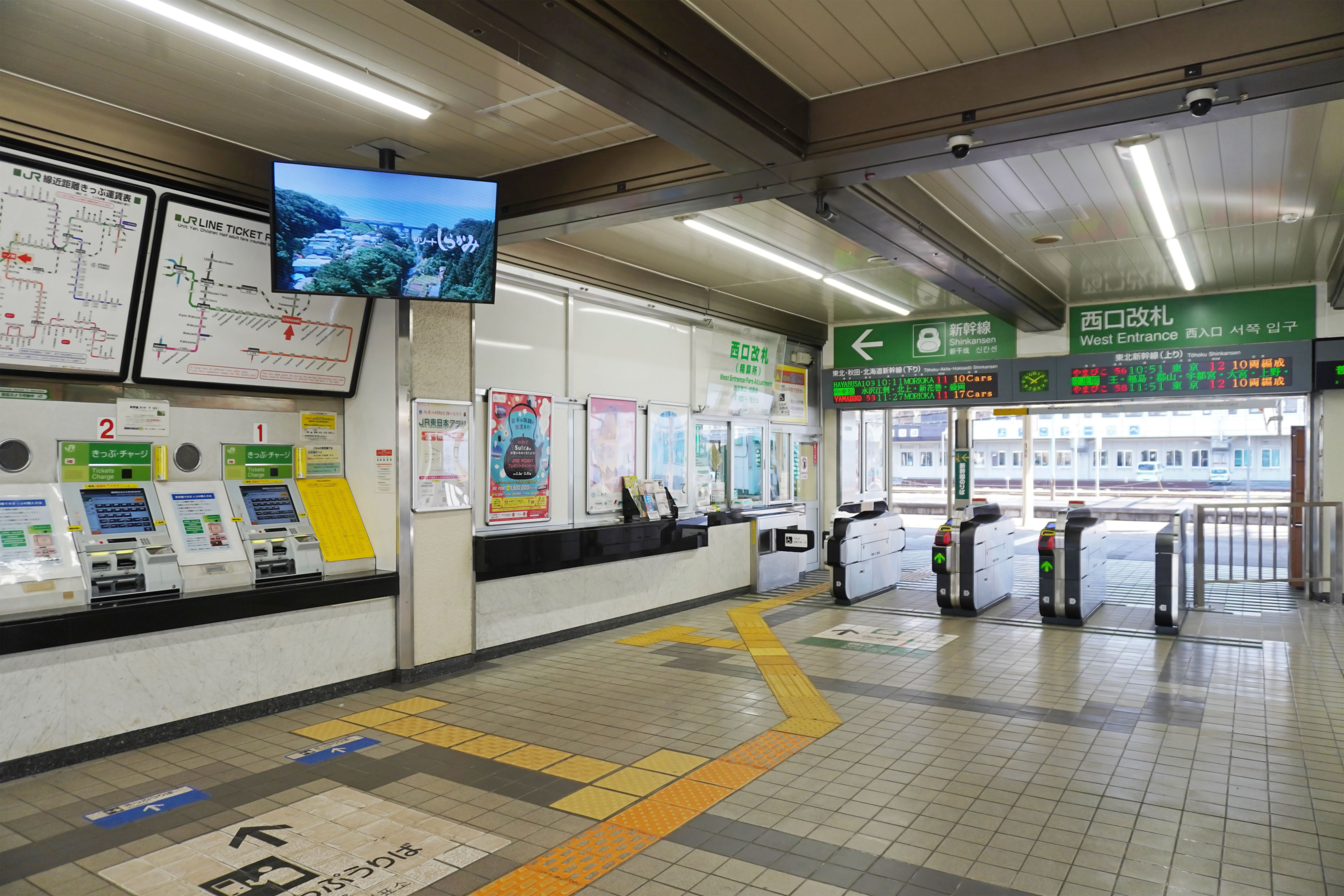
Ticket gates (west side)

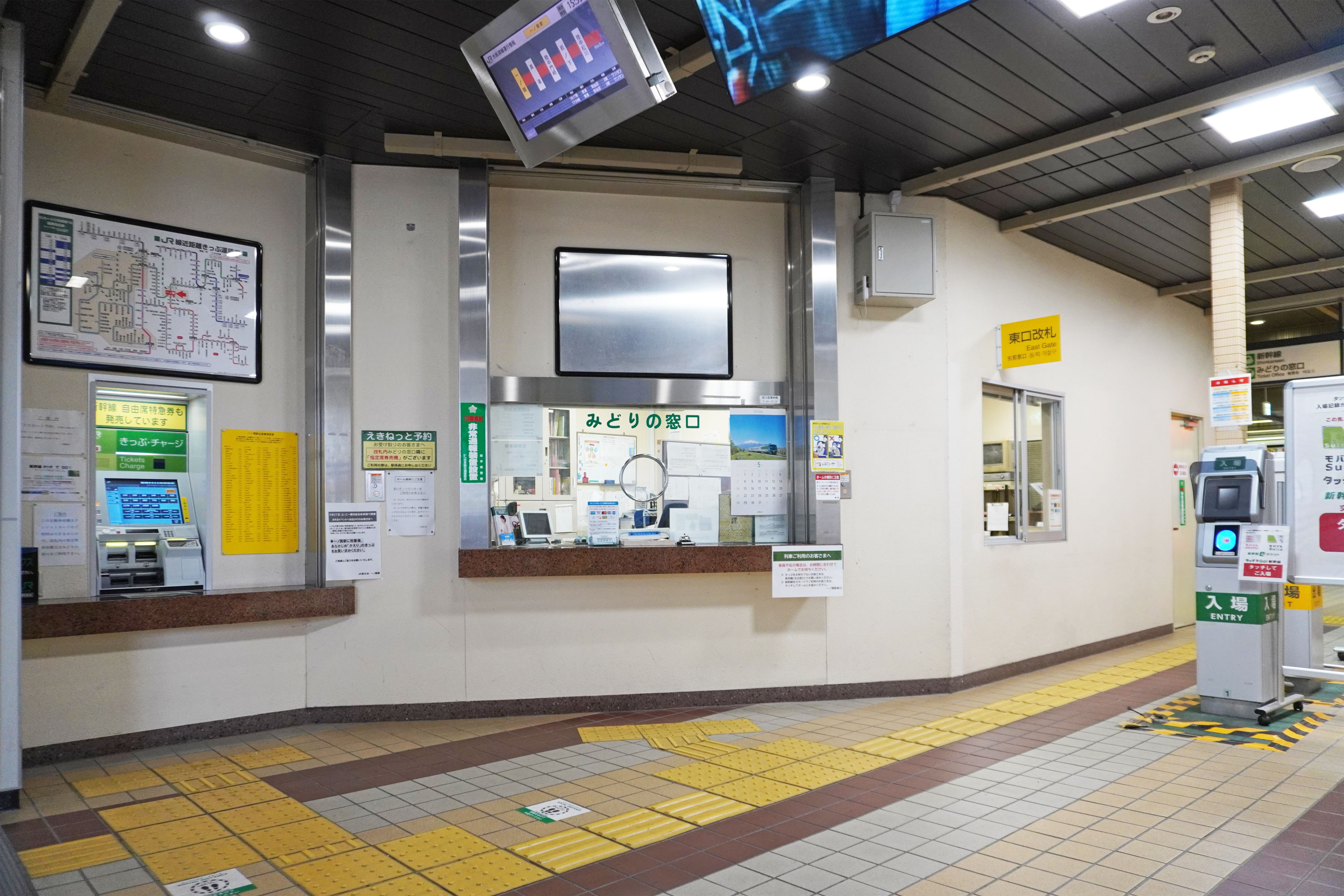
Ticket gates (east side)

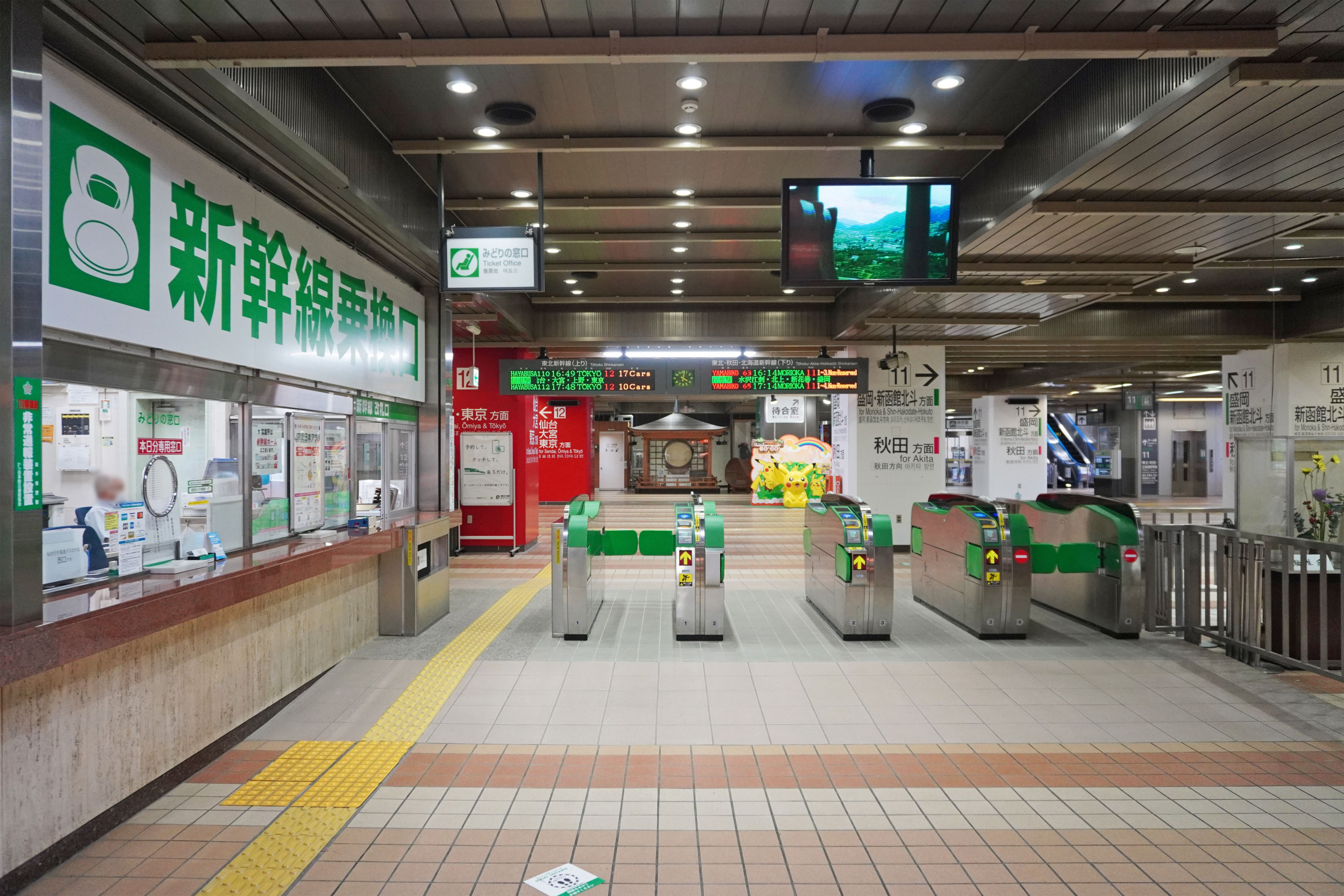
Shinkansen gates

=== Platforms ===
1	■ Tōhoku Main Line	for Kitakami and Morioka for Kogota and Sendai (starting services)
2	■ Tōhoku Main Line	for Kogota and Sendai for Kitakami and Morioka (starting services)
3	■ Ōfunato Line	for Kesennuma
11	■ Tohoku Shinkansen	for Morioka, Shin-Aomori, and Akita
12	■ Tohoku Shinkansen	for Sendai, Ōmiya, and Tokyo

== History ==
Ichinoseki Station opened on April 16, 1890 on what is now the Tōhoku Main Line. Service on the Ōfunato Line started from July 26, 1925, and on the Tōhoku Shinkansen from June 23, 1982. The station was absorbed into the JR East network upon the privatization of the Japanese National Railways (JNR) on April 1, 1987.

== Passenger statistics ==
In fiscal year 2018, the station was used by an average of 4,398 passengers daily (boarding passengers only).

== Surrounding area ==
- Ichinoseki City Hall
- Ichinoseki Post Office

== See also ==
- List of railway stations in Japan
