= List of mergers in Iwate Prefecture =

Here is a list of mergers in Iwate Prefecture, Japan since the Heisei era.

== Mergers before April 1, 1999 ==
- On April 1, 1991 - the old city of Kitakami absorbed the town of Waga and the village of Ezuriko (both from Waga District) to create the new and expanded city of Kitakami.

== Mergers ==
- On November 15, 2001 - the town of Sanriku (from Kesen District) was merged into the expanded city of Ōfunato.
- On June 6, 2005 - the old city of Miyako absorbed the town of Tarō and village of Niisato (both from Shimohei District) to create the new and expanded city of Miyako.
- On September 1, 2005 - the towns of Ashiro and Nishine, and the village of Matsuo (all from Iwate District) were merged to create the city of Hachimantai.
- On September 20, 2005 - the old city of Ichinoseki absorbed the towns of Daitō, Higashiyama and Senmaya, and the villages of Kawasaki and Murone (all from Higashiiwai District), and the town of Hanaizumi (from Nishiiwai District) to create the new and expanded city of Ichinoseki.
- On October 1, 2005 - the old city of Tōno absorbed the village of Miyamori (from Kamihei District) to create the new and expanded city of Tōno.
- On November 1, 2005 - the town of Yuda and village of Sawauchi (both from Waga District) were merged to create the town of Nishiwaga.
- On January 1, 2006 - the old city of Hanamaki absorbed the towns of Ishidoriya and Ōhasama (both from Hienuki District), and the town of Tōwa (from Waga District) to create the new and expanded city of Hanamaki. Hienuki District was dissolved as a result of this merger.
- On January 1, 2006 - the old city of Ninohe absorbed the town of Jōbōji (from Ninohe District) to create the new and expanded city of Ninohe.
- On January 1, 2006 - the town of Taneichi and the village of Ōno (both from Kunohe District) were merged to create the town of Hirono.
- On January 10, 2006 - the village of Tamayama (from Iwate District) was merged into the expanded city of Morioka.
- On February 20, 2006 - the cities of Esashi and Mizusawa merged with the towns of Isawa and Maesawa, and the village of Koromogawa (all from Isawa District) to create the city of Ōshū.
- On March 6, 2006 - the old city of Kuji absorbed the village of Yamagata (from Kunohe District) to create the new and expanded city of Kuji.
- On January 1, 2010 - the old city of Miyako absorbed the village of Kawai (from Shimohei District) to create the new and expanded city of Miyako.
- On September 26, 2011 - the town of Fujisawa (from Higashiiwai District) was merged into the expanded city of Ichinoseki. Higashiiwai District was dissolved as a result of this merger.
- On January 1, 2014 - the village of Takizawa (from Iwate District) was promoted to city status.
