= Yushima Station =

Yushima Station is the name of two train stations in Japan.

- Yushima Station (Iwate) - (油島駅) in Ichinoseki, Iwate
- Yushima Station (Tokyo) - (湯島駅) in Bunkyō, Tokyo
