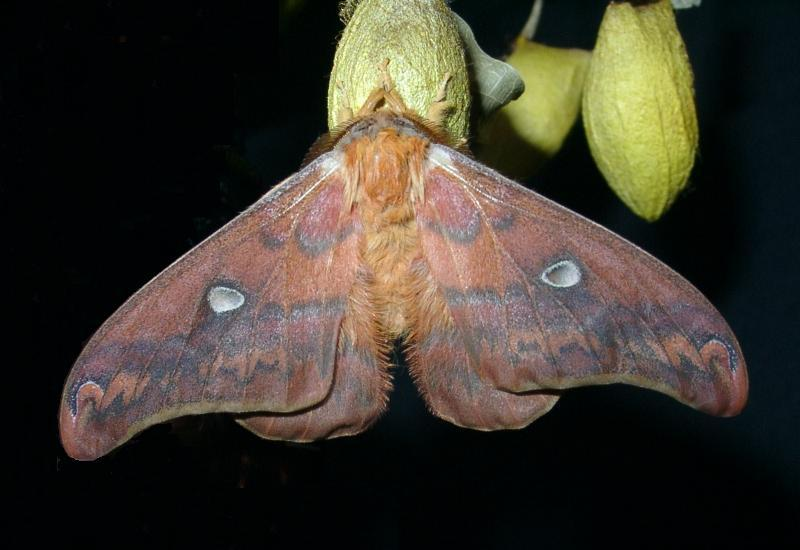
- Male
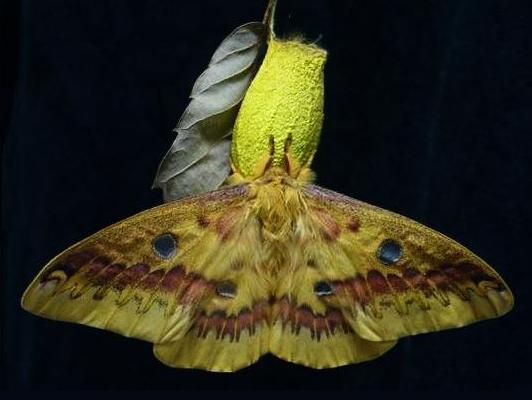
- Female

Scientific classification
- Kingdom: Animalia
- Phylum: Arthropoda
- Clade: Pancrustacea
- Class: Insecta
- Order: Lepidoptera
- Family: Saturniidae
- Genus: Rhodinia
- Species: R. fugax

Binomial name
- Rhodinia fugax Butler, 1877

= Rhodinia fugax =

Squeaking silkmoth

Species of moth

Rhodinia fugax, the squeaking silkmoth, is a moth in the family Saturniidae. It was described by Arthur Gardiner Butler in 1877. It is native to Korea, Japan, China, and the Russian Far East.

The squeaking silkmoth is known as ウスタビガ (usutabiga, 薄手火蛾) in the Japanese language, 透目大蚕蛾 (tòu mù dà cán'é) in the Chinese language, and 유리산누에나방 (yurisannuenabang) in the Korean language. The Japanese common name translates to "thin hand fire moth", with tabi, "hand fire" being an archaic term for a lantern. The "lanterns" refer to the pupae left behind by the moths after their emergence, which, on defoliated trees in winter, resemble lanterns. The English epithet is derived from the caterpillar's defense mechanism, which consists of an audible squeaking akin to that of a squeak toy. The sound is produced through rapid bodily contraction, which forces air through the spiracles of the larva.

The pupae of R. fugax are separately known as ヤマカマス (yama-kamasu). They were named because of their resemblance to kamasu, folded straw mats used as storage. Cocoons from R. fugax were used historically to treat whooping cough on top of various usages as folk remedies, silk from its cocoons have been used as a type of wild silk.

== Description ==
Rhodinia fugax has a wingspan between 75 and 110 millimeters. R. fugax is sexually dimorphic, with males being smaller than females. Males range in size between 75 and 90 millimeters, and females range in size between 80 and 110 millimeters. Their coloration resembles that of oak leaves during the autumn season to serve as camouflage. Both sexes have translucent eyespots on their wings and have hairy bodies. Their hairy bodies aid in thermoregulation due to their late emergence in autumn.

Males of Rhodinia fugax display a variable appearance compared to the females. They range in color from yellow, orange, brown, and black. Males are always darker in color than the females. Females are always yellow, with the color of their submarginal band varying in thickness and the intensity of its color. Male forewings are more elongated than the rounded forewings of the females.

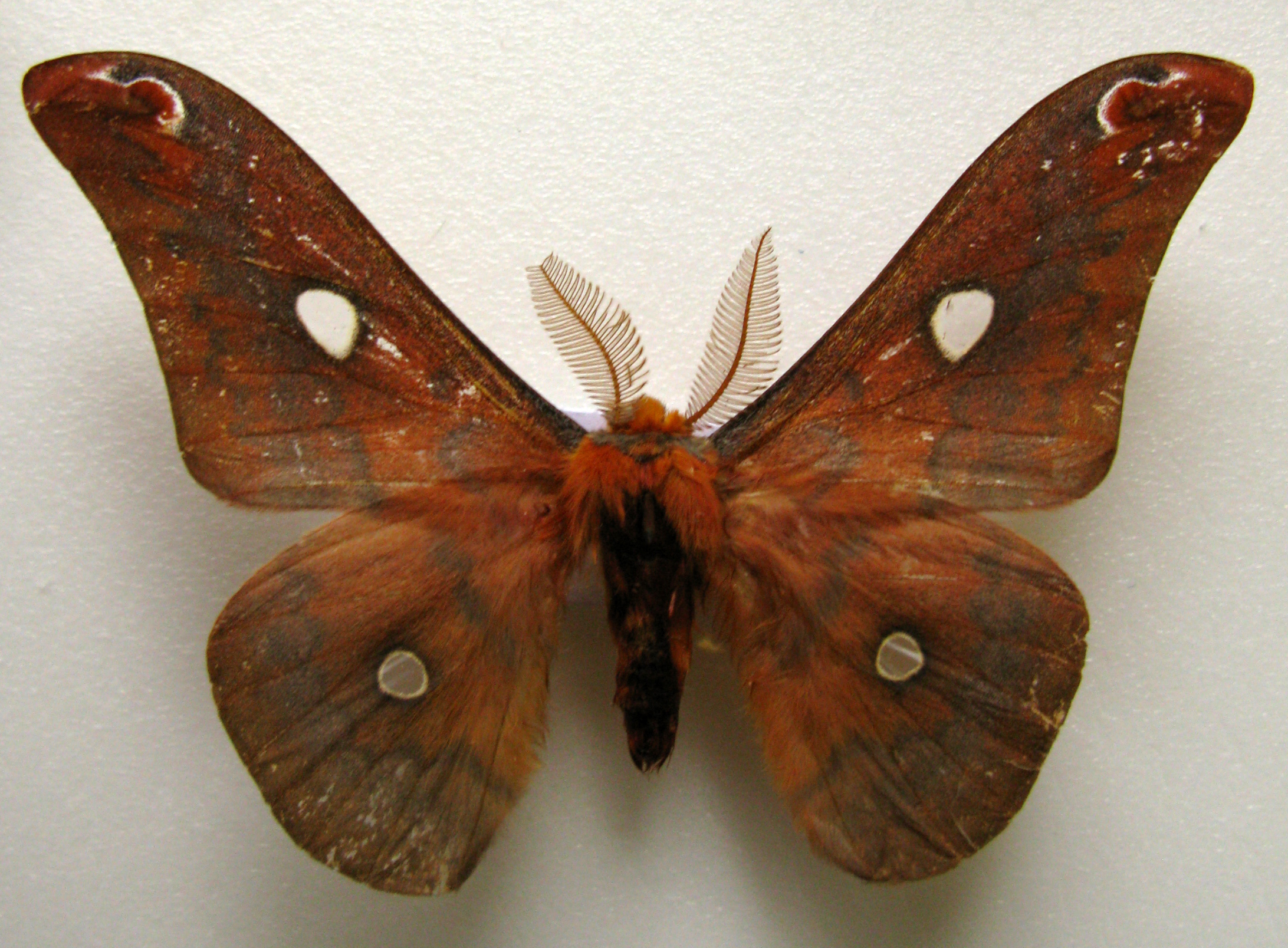
R. fugax diana male

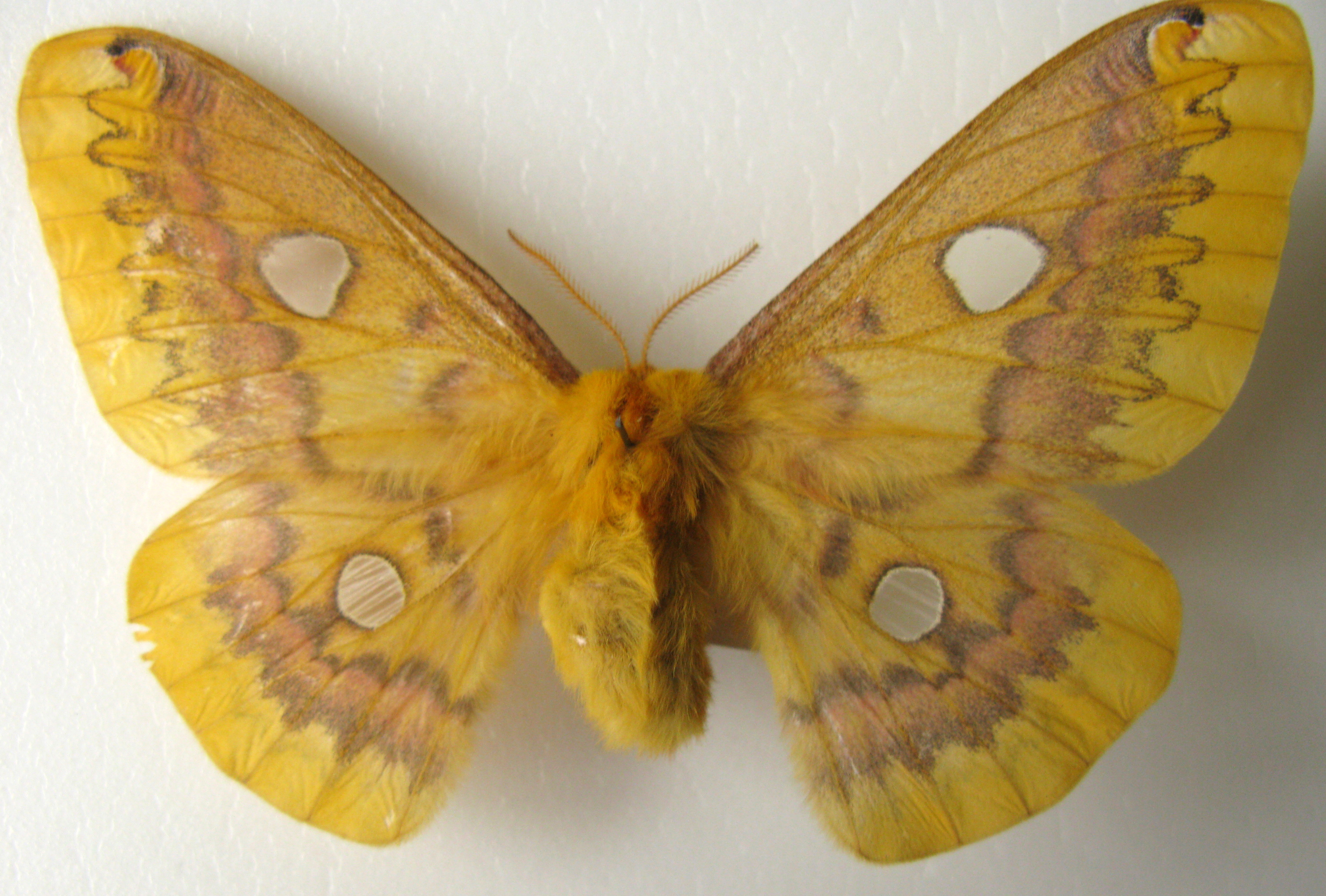
R. fugax diana female

== Life history ==
=== Eggs ===
Eggs overwinter, or enter a state of diapause during the winter, with the process of blastokinesis, embryonic development, occurring during March. Eggs hatch during April as the temperatures rise. The time of hatching is synchronized to the emergence of hostplant leaf development. The eggs are often laid on the surface of cocoons that the moths have previously emerged from. Unlike most Japanese saturniid moths, the moths overwinter as eggs, rather than as a pupa.

Experiments conducted on R. fugax found that eggs kept at 25 degrees Celsius resulted in death. Delayed hatching directly correlated to colder temperatures: with 87 days at 20 °C, 100 days at 15 °C, and 145 days at 10 °C. Larvae would develop within the eggs if kept at 5 °C for a duration of 370 days, but eggs kept at this temperature would result in death prior to hatching.

=== Larvae ===
The larvae are polyphagous, feeding on a wide variety of plants. These include: Acer spp., Castanea crenata, Celtis pallida, Celtis sinensis, Fagus spp., Hevea brasiliensis, Ilex verticillata, Phellodendron amurense, Platanus spp., Prunus domestica, Quercus acutissima, Quercus cerris, Quercus cuspidata, Quercus serrata, Quercus variabilis, Salix spp., and Zelkova serrata. In captivity, R. fugax larvae specifically prefer Quercus serrata, Zelkova spp., Phellodendron amurense, and Prunus spp.

A total of five instars occur during the larval development. The first instar is small in size and the body is entirely black and covered in dark hairs. In captivity, the larvae are recommended to be reared on Crataegus buds. Second instars are slightly larger, blue tubercules on the second bodily segment, with a black stripe running down the side of its body. The third instars are bright green, with blue tubercules running down the sides of its body, it has mostly lost the black coloration that the previous two instars display. The fourth instar is entirely green and displaying the same amount of tubercules as the previous instar. The final instar is instantly distinguishable from the previous four, as they lack the spines that the previous instars exhibit. The fourth and fifth instars defend themselves by emitting an audible squeaking sound through ejecting air from their trachea through the spiracles which is described as sounding using the Japanese onomatopoeia "キュー、キュー" (kyu-kyu). The sound that the larvae emit make them popular with children. The larvae are preyed upon by parasitoid wasps, including Gregopimpla ussuriensis (Ichneumonidae, Pimplinae) which is a major predator for the larvae.

=== Pupae ===
Time lapse of a R. fugax larva undergoing pupation

Larvae begin to enter the pupal stage around June and July. The pupae are bright green to act as camouflage amongst the green foliage, the pupal case sports an open slit at the top to allow the adult moth to emerge. They are hung using a silk thread on tree branches. Empty cocoons can be spotted hung amongst defoliated tree branches during the winter months.

=== Adults ===
Adults emerge between the late autumn months of October and November. Adults emerged from 2 PM to 6 PM. Only one generation of moths are produced yearly, thus making R. fugax univoltine. The moth is diurnal, flying during the early mornings, finding its mate during its daytime flight. The adult moths lack mouthparts, thus making their lifespans brief. Male and female moths concentrate their energy as adults to find a mate before they die. Mating begins between 5 AM-8 AM, and ends in the time between 3 PM-6 PM, unlike other saturniid moths such as Antheraea yamamai and Antheraea pernyi which mate during the evening. Virgin females on average lived for 15.1 days, while females who have mated live for only 3.5 days on average. Oviposition occurs during the evening, ending around 6 PM.

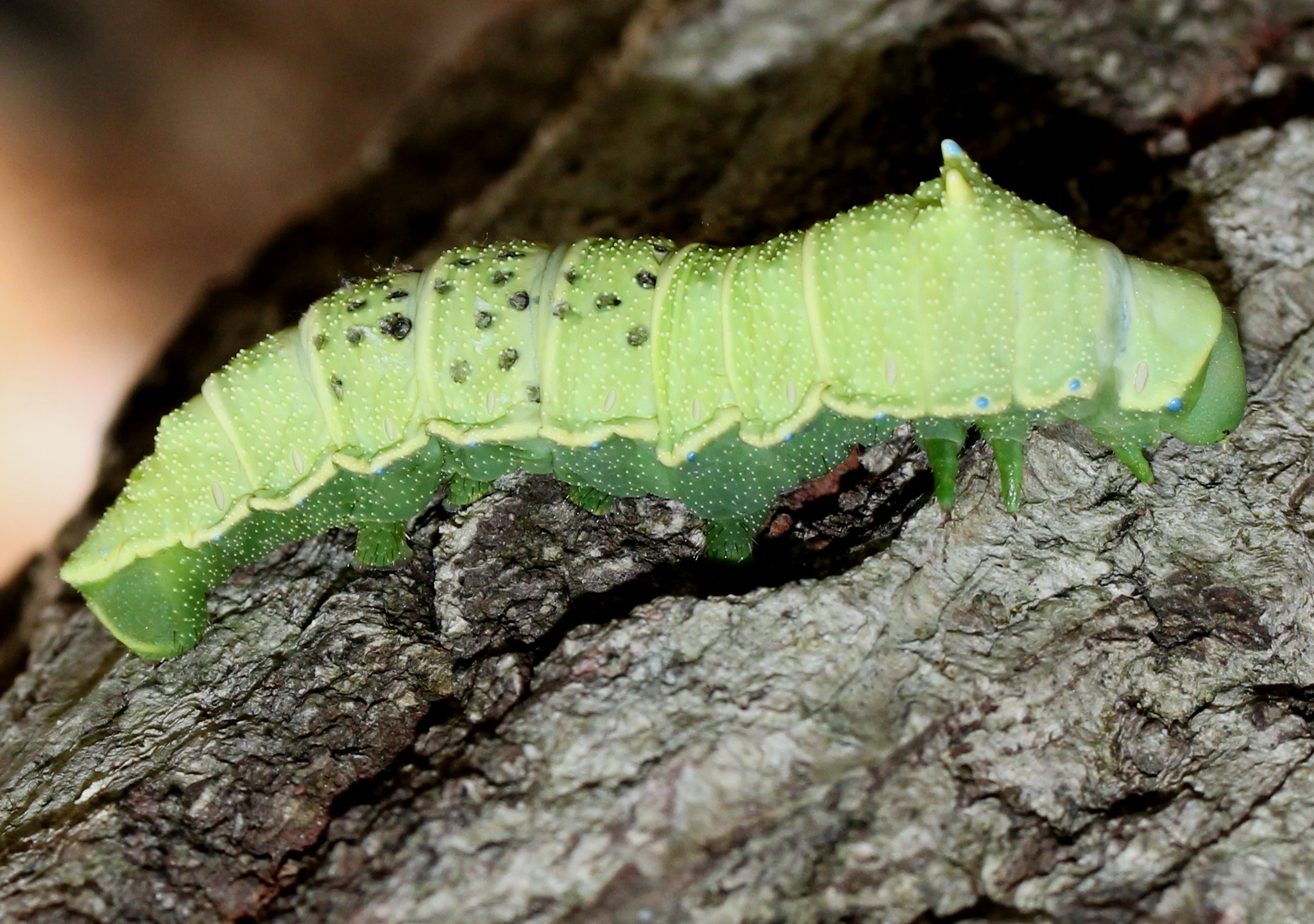
Final instar with a dotted back due to parasitoid wasps

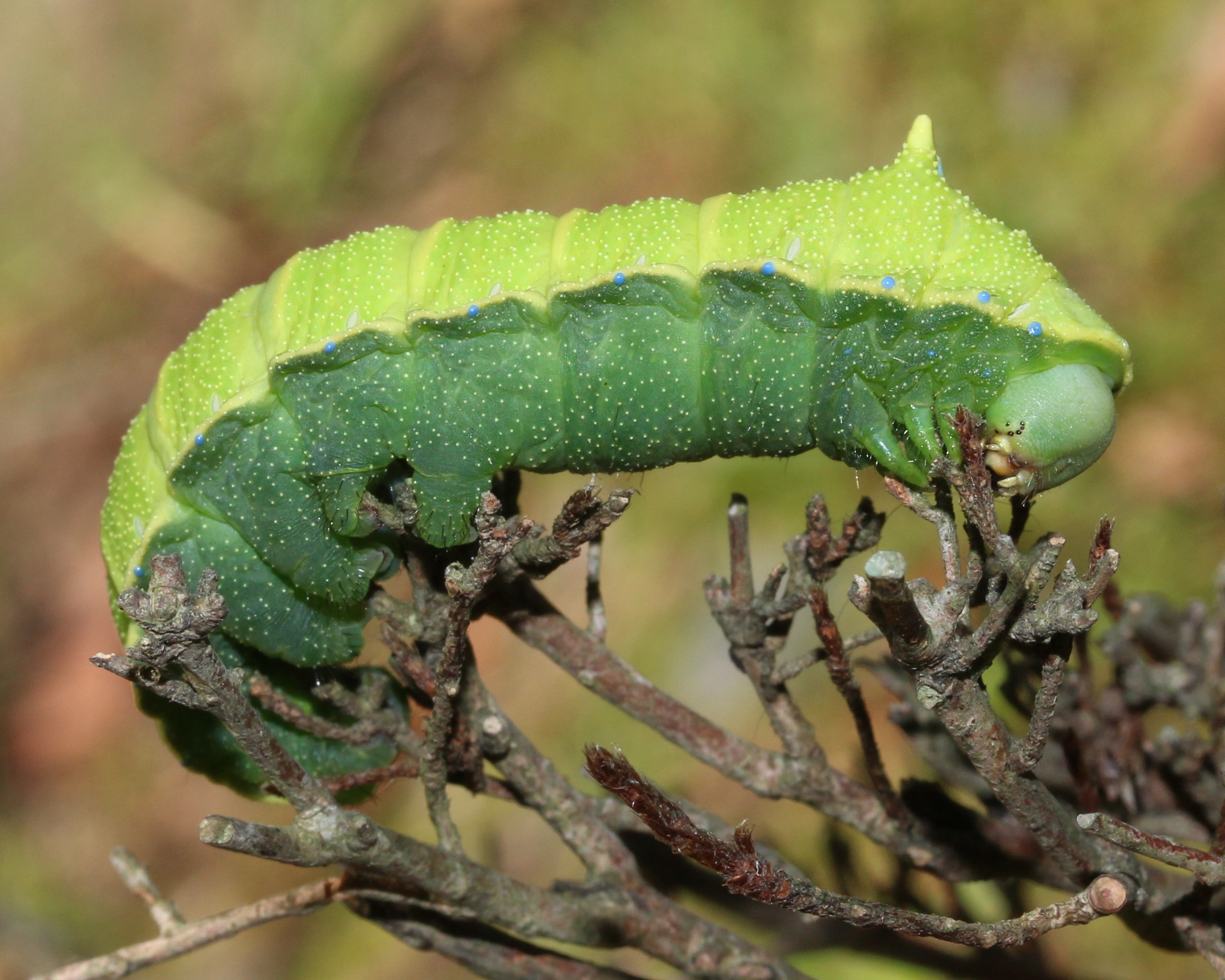
Final instar

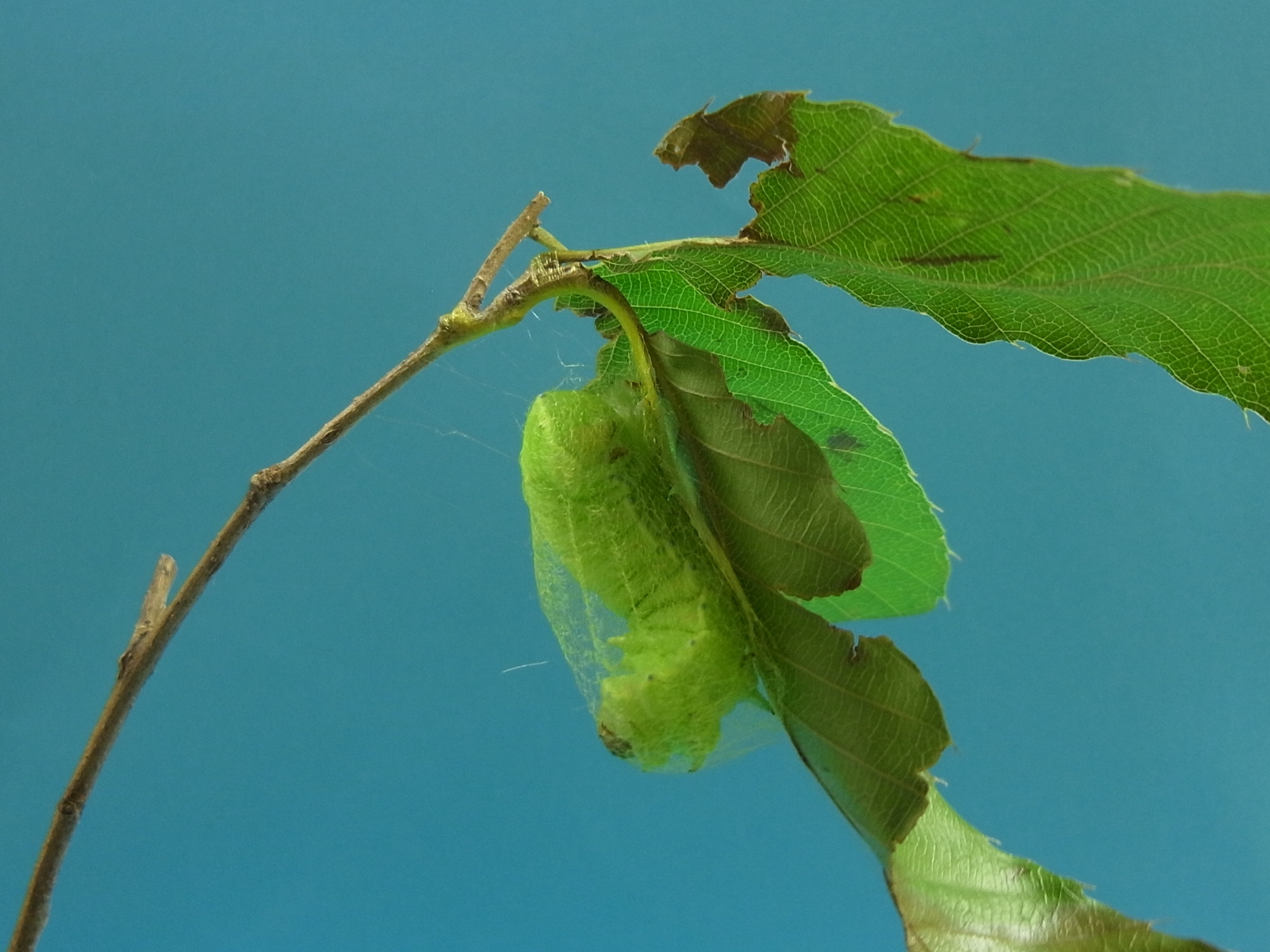
R. fugax larva in the process of spinning a cocoon

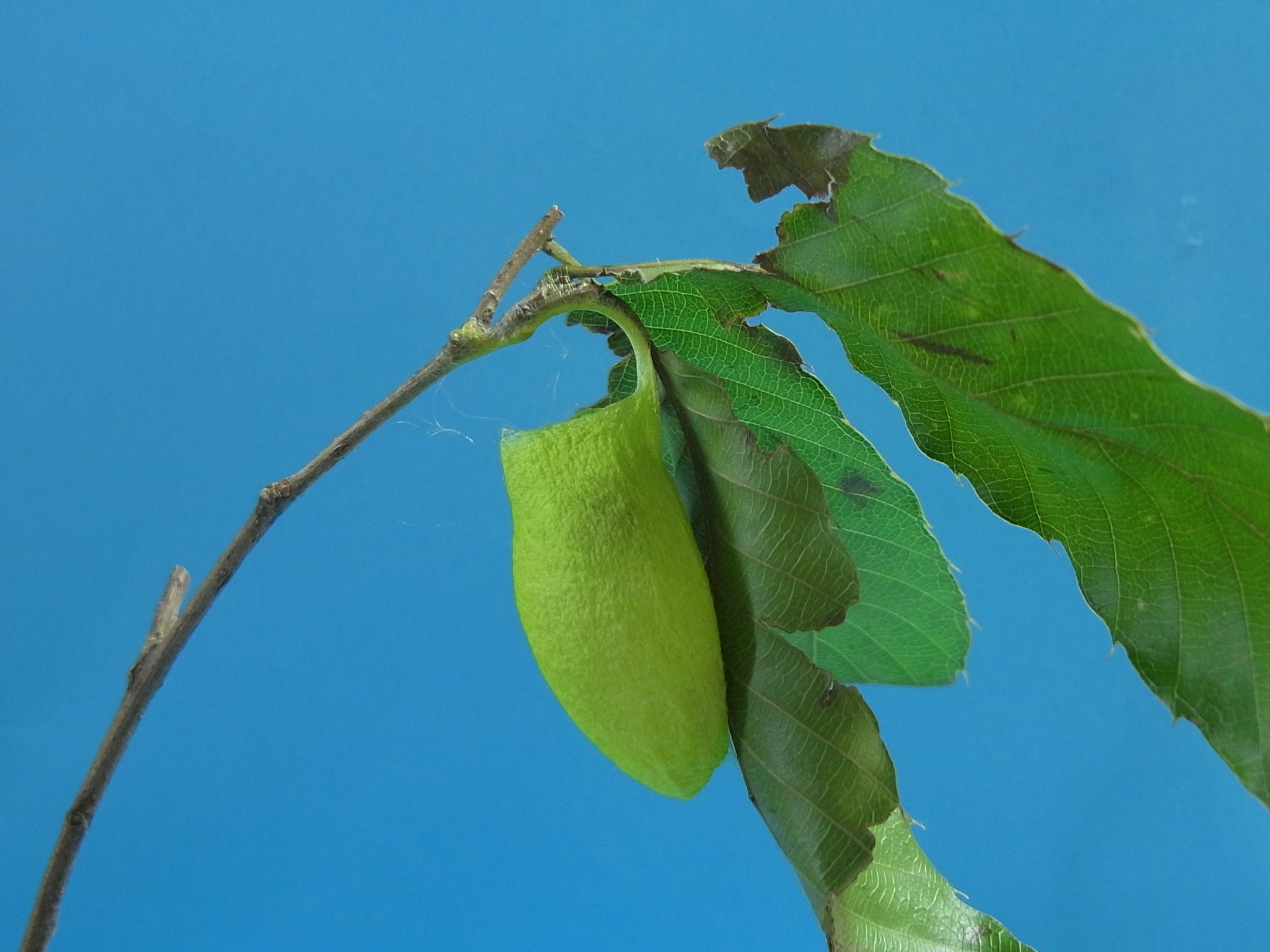
Cocoon of R. fugax

== Distribution ==
The squeaking silkmoth is found in Korea, Japan, China, and the Russian Far East. In Japan, it is found throughout the islands of Hokkaido, Honshu, Shikoku, and Kyushu. It has been additionally sighted on Sado Island. In China it is known in the provinces of Hebei, Heilongjiang, Henan, Inner Mongolia, Jilin, Liaoning, Ningxia, Shandong, and Shanxi. Additional discoveries by Ronald Brechlin in 2007 extends the range within China as far south as the province of Guangdong and as far west as the Tibet Autonomous Region.

The nominate subspecies fugax is found throughout the Japanese main islands of Honshu, Shikoku, and Kyushu. Subspecies diana is found on the northern island of Hokkaido. Subspecies diana has also been recorded on Manchuria, and the Russian Far East. Subspecies szechuanensis is known from the Chinese provinces of Sichuan and Yunnan. Subspecies shaanxiana is found in the Chinese province of Shaanxi. Subspecies jiangxiana is found in the Chinese province of Jiangxi. Subspecies guangdongensis is found in the Chinese provinces of Guangdong and Hunan. Subspecies flavescens is found in the autonomous region of Tibet, with Brechlin's original description referring to it as "Xizang Zizhiqu".

=== Habitat ===
The adults inhabit Satoyama hillsides, flatlands, and mountainous regions.

== Interactions with humans ==
The primary interaction between Rhodinia fugax have been in regards to its cocoons. Humans in Japan have used its cocoons for a variety of purposes, including talismans and folk remedies. R. fugax silk has been researched for its potential in aiding in the production of new forms of biomaterials.

The cocoons of Rhodinia fugax were historically used as a remedy for tumors and lumps by reducing them in whooping cough sufferers. More specifically, the cocoons were used as folk remedies in various parts of Japan. In the vicinity of Fujisawa in Iwate prefecture, boiled cocoons were used as a folk remedy for mouth ulcers. In the region between Fukushima prefecture and northern Tochigi prefecture, cocoons were attached to the throat to prevent colds. Azuki beans placed within the cocoons were used as talismans in Gifu prefecture. In the Hida region, cocoons were attached to injuries and used as finger cots. The pupae have been historically eaten by the people of Nagano prefecture, served as tsukudani. Supplements made from its pupae have been sold as a quack dietary supplement.

Rhodinia fugax produces a type of wild silk, and has been researched for its commercial potential with limited success. Silk from R. fugax showed the lowest temperature needed for thermal degradation from 369 to 371 °C. Researchers have successfully cloned leucine-rich fibroin genes extracted from the silk glands in R. fugax. Further research into fibroin genes from R. fugax can yield new varieties of biomaterials.

A passage within The Pillow Book titled "みのむし、いとあはれなり" refers to a "screaming bagworm". It is likely that this "minomushi"; which directly translates to "bagworm" is the larva of R. fugax.

== Etymology ==
The specific name of fugax means shy in Latin, fugax can also mean swift flight.

=== Vernacular names ===
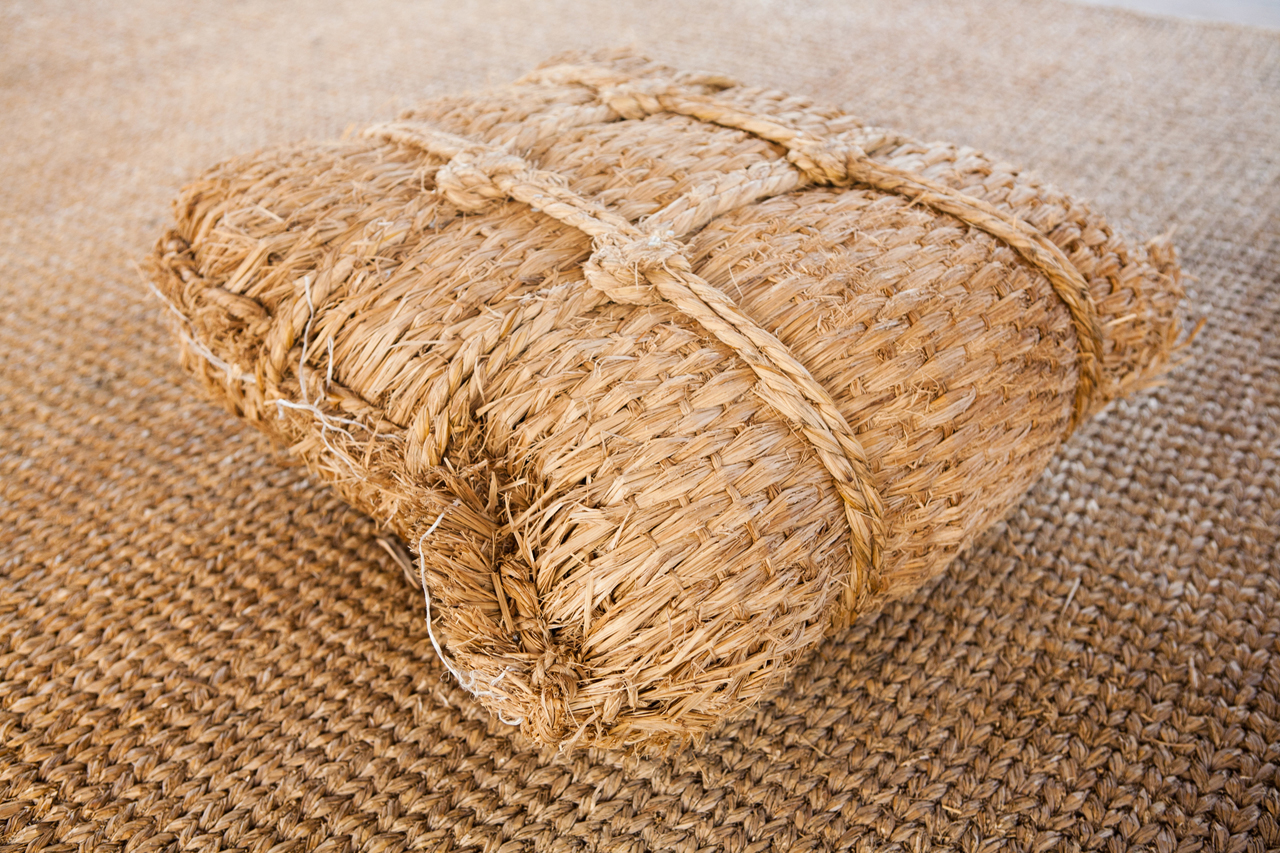
A woven kamasu bag

The English vernacular name for Rhodinia fugax is the Squeaking silkmoth. The name is derived from the caterpillars habit of squeaking when threatened to ward off any potential predators. It has also been referred to as the Pellucid-spotted silk moth in English.

The Japanese name for the imago of R. fugax is ウスタビガ Usutabiga. Usutabiga is written in kanji as 薄手火蛾. The Japanese vernacular name directly translates to "thin hand fire moth", with "hand fire" being an archaic term for a lantern. The name is derived from the emptied cocoons hanging from tree branches resembling lanterns. Subspecies diana is known commonly as ウスタビガ 北海道亜種, or the "Hokkaido subspecies of Usutabiga". Rhodinia fugax is known by the name 유리산누에나방 (yulisannuenabang) in the Korean language, which directly translates to "glass silkworm moth". In the Chinese language it is known by the name 透目大蠶蛾, or 透目大蚕蛾 (Tòu mù dà cán'é) in Simplified Chinese, its common name translates to "transparent large silkmoth".

The silken cocoons are most often called ヤマカマス, yama-kamasu. Kamasu were folded straw mats, frequently used as bags which resemble the folded cocoons that R. fugax larvae produce. They have been alternatively known as ツリカマス tsuri-kamasu and ヤマビシャク yama-bishaku.

== Taxonomy ==
=== Classification ===
The genus Rhodinia was of uncertain taxonomic position, with no consensus on Rhodinia's placement within either the tribes Attacini or Saturniini within the Saturniinae. Some researchers, including Bouvier (1936), classify Rhodinia within its own tribe, the Rhodiicae, together with the genus Pararhodia. Chen and colleagues (2021), through genetic analysis determined that the genus Rhodinia belonged in the Attacini rather than Saturniini.

Rhodinia fugax had its entire mitogenome sequenced in 2021 by Dong-Bin Chen et al. The moth had its mitogenome sequenced with 25 separate mitogenomes from multiple families and representative species within the family Saturniidae to determine its broader placement. Chen and colleagues found that the genome in its entirety had a length of 15,334 base pairs, akin to other saturniids such as Actias selene (15,236 base pairs) and Antheraea proylei (15,575 base pairs).

=== Subspecies ===
Three subspecies are currently recognized by GBIF.

- Rhodinia fugax diana Oberthür 1886
- Rhodinia fugax fugax Butler 1877
- Rhodinia fugax szechuanensis Mell 1938

The National Center for Biotechnology Information recognizes an additional 4 subspecies, all described by Ronald Brechlin in 2007.

- Rhodinia fugax flavescens Brechlin 2007
- Rhodinia fugax guangdongensis Brechlin 2007
- Rhodinia fugax jiangxiana Brechlin 2007
- Rhodinia fugax shaanxiana Brechlin 2007
