= Hanaizumi Station =

Railway station in Ichinoseki, Iwate Prefecture, Japan

Hanaizumi Station 花泉駅
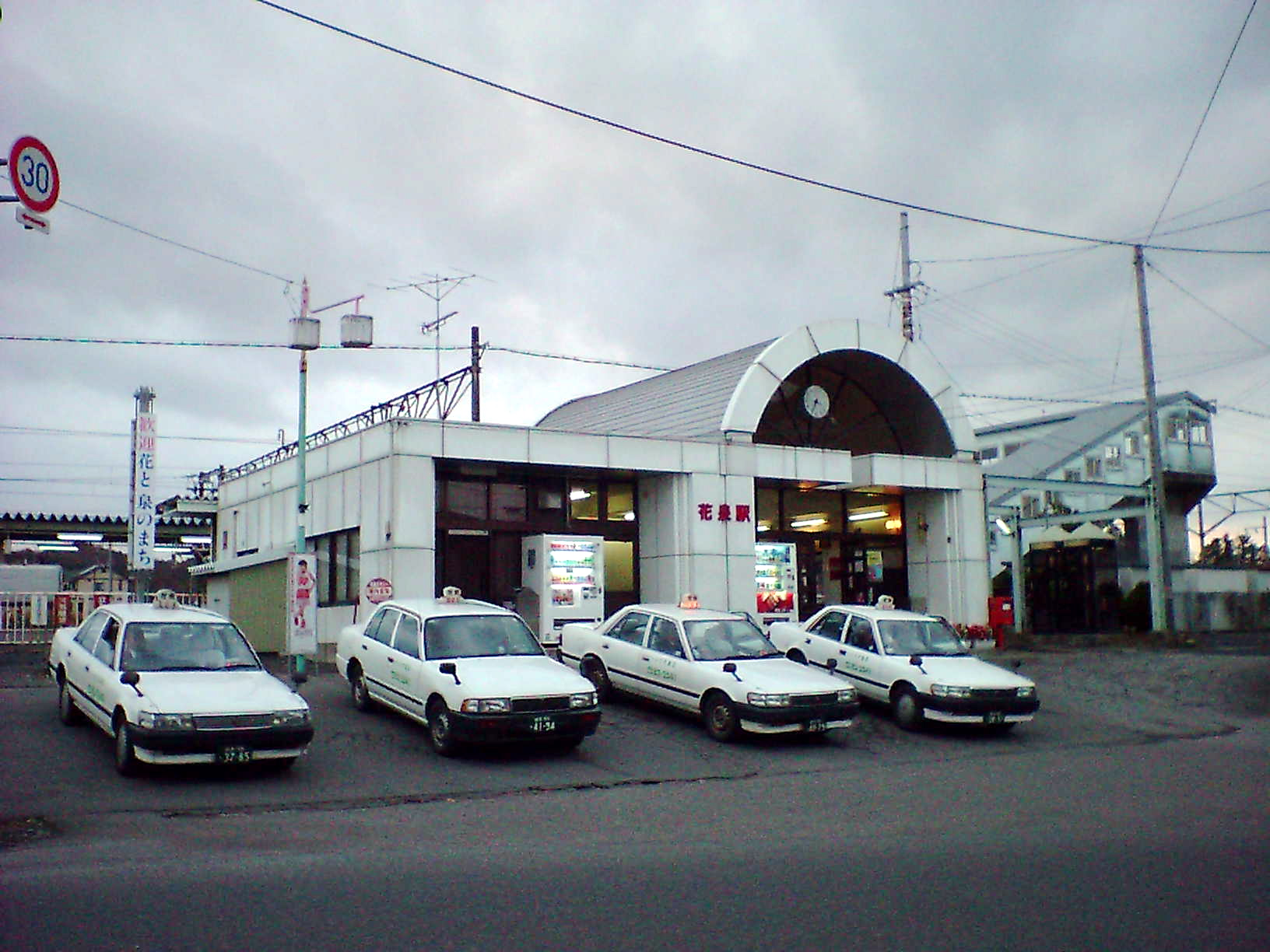
- Hanaizumi Station, November 2005

General information
- Location: Hanaizumi-cho Hanaizumi-aze, Ichinoseki-shi, Iwate-ken 029-3101; Japan
- Coordinates: 38.8341°N 141.1810°E
- Operator: JR East
- Line: ■ Tōhoku Main Line
- Distance: 431.2 km from Tokyo
- Platforms: 1 side + 1 island platform
- Tracks: 3

Construction
- Structure type: At grade

Other information
- Status: Staffed ("Midori no Madoguchi")
- Website: Official website

History
- Opened: April 16, 1890

Passengers
- FY2018: 357 daily

Services
Preceding station	JR East	Following station
Yushima towards Kuroiso	Tōhoku Main Line Local	Shimizuhara towards Morioka
Location
- Location within Iwate Prefecture Location within Japan

Hanaizumi Station (花泉駅, Hanaizumi-eki) is a railway station in the city of Ichinoseki, Iwate, Japan, operated by East Japan Railway Company (JR East).

== Lines ==
Hanaizumi Station is served by the Tōhoku Main Line, and is located 431.2 km from the official starting point of the line at Tokyo Station.

== Station layout ==
The station has a side platform and an island platform, both connected to the station building by a footbridge. The station has a "Midori no Madoguchi" staffed ticket office.

=== Platforms ===
1	■ Tōhoku Main Line	for Ichinoseki
2	■ Tōhoku Main Line	for Kogota and Sendai
3	■ Tōhoku Main Line	not in regular use

== History ==
Hanaizumi Station opened on 16 April 1890. It was absorbed into the JR East network upon the privatization of the Japanese National Railways (JNR) on 1 April 1987.

== Passenger statistics ==
In fiscal 2018, the station was used by an average of 357 passengers daily (boarding passengers only).

== Surrounding area ==
- Ichinoseki City Hall Hanaizumi Branch (formerly Hanaizumi Town Hall)
- Hanaizumi Post Office
- Iwate Prefectural Hanaizumi High School
- Iwate Prefectural Hanaizumi Hospital
- National Route 342

== See also ==
- List of railway stations in Japan
