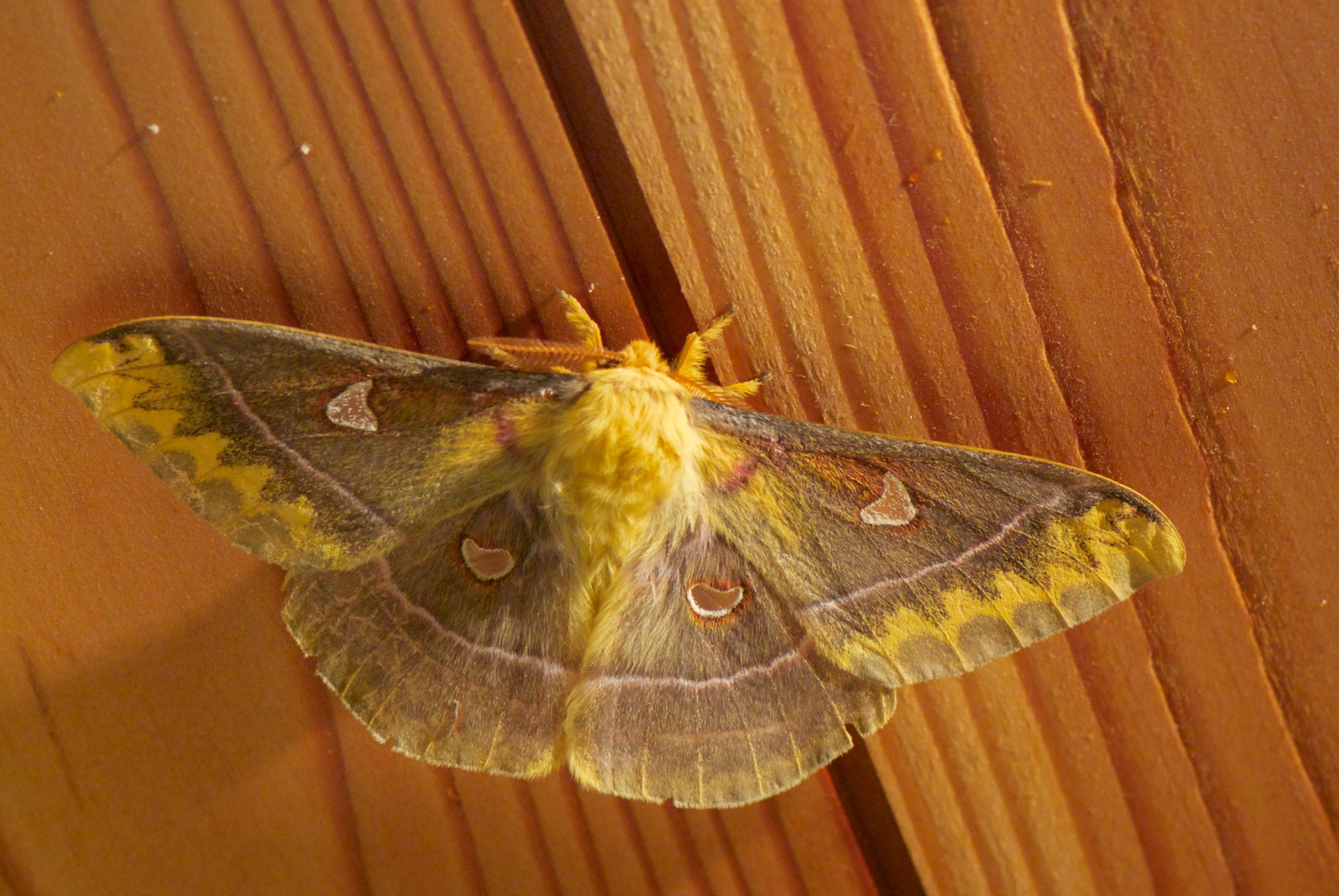
- Rhodinia jankowskii

Scientific classification
- Kingdom: Animalia
- Phylum: Arthropoda
- Class: Insecta
- Order: Lepidoptera
- Family: Saturniidae
- Tribe: Attacini
- Genus: Rhodinia; Staudinger, 1892

= Rhodinia =

Genus of moths

Rhodinia is a genus of moths in the family Saturniidae first described by Otto Staudinger in 1892.

== Species ==
- Rhodinia broschi Brechlin, 2001
- Rhodinia davidi (Oberthuer, 1886)
- Rhodinia fugax (Butler, 1877)
- Rhodinia grigauti Le Moult, 1933
- Rhodinia jankowskii (Oberthuer, 1880)
- Rhodinia newara (Moore, 1872)
- Rhodinia rudloffi Brechlin, 2001
- Rhodinia silkae Brechlin & van Schayck, 2010
- Rhodinia szechuanensis Mell, 1938
- Rhodinia tenzingyatsoi Naumann, 2001
- Rhodinia verecunda Inoue, 1984
