= Shimizuhara Station =

Railway station in Ichinoseki, Iwate Prefecture, Japan

Shimizuhara Station 清水原駅
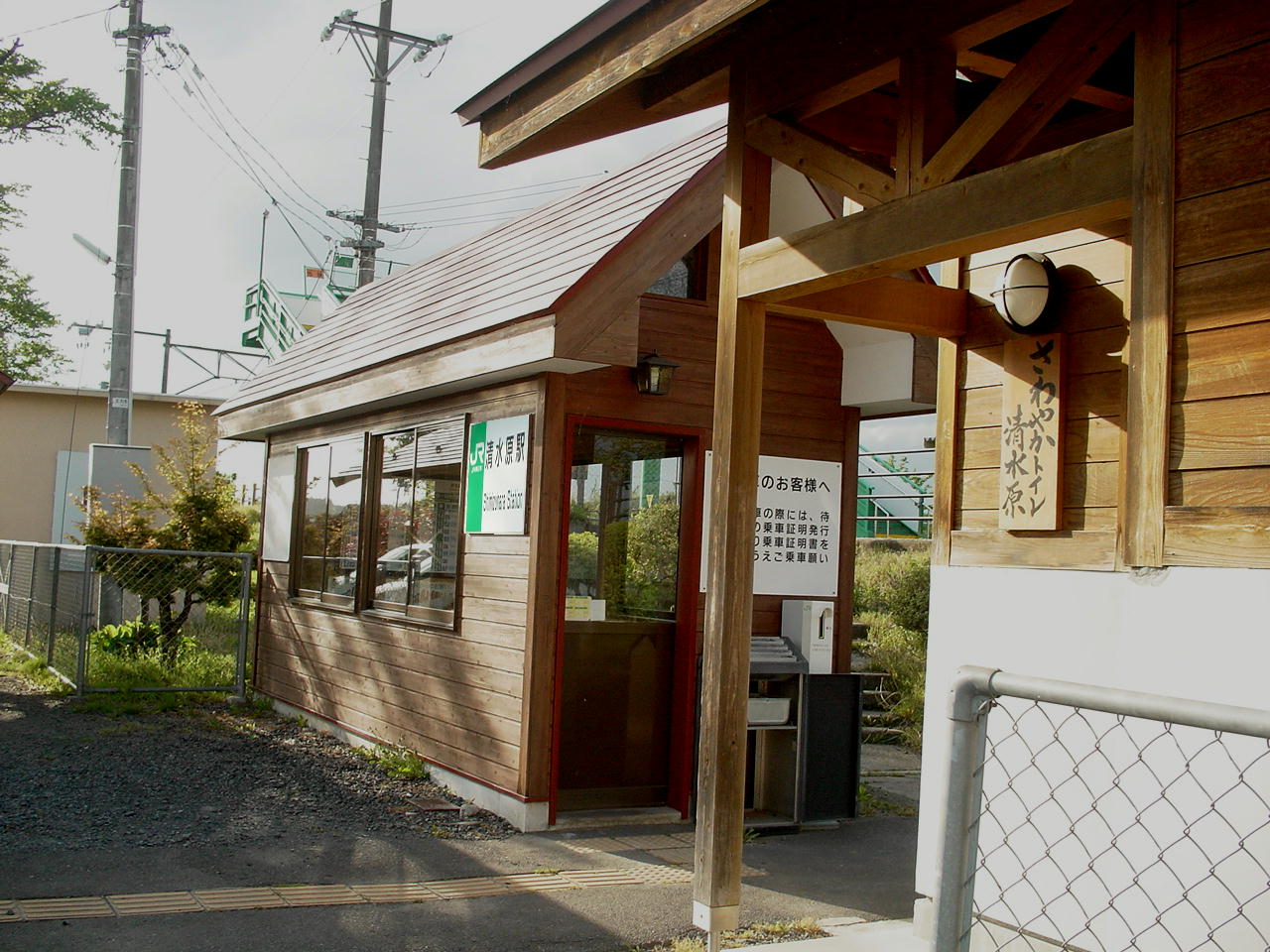
- Shimizuhara Station, May 2005

General information
- Location: Hanaizumi-cho Hanaizumi-Niohara, Ichinoseki-shi, Iwate-ken 029-3101; Japan
- Coordinates: 38.8548°N 141.1563°E
- Operator: JR East
- Line: ■ Tōhoku Main Line
- Distance: 434.4 km from Tokyo
- Platforms: 1 side platforms
- Tracks: 2

Construction
- Structure type: At grade

Other information
- Status: Unstaffed
- Website: Official website

History
- Opened: 1 July 1955

Services
Preceding station	JR East	Following station
Hanaizumi towards Kuroiso	Tōhoku Main Line Local	Arikabe towards Morioka
Location
- Location within Iwate Prefecture Location within Japan

Shimizuhara Station (清水原駅, Shimizuhara-eki) is a railway station in the city of Ichinoseki, Japan, operated by East Japan Railway Company (JR East).

== Lines ==
Shimizuhara Station is served by the Tōhoku Main Line, and is located 434.4 rail kilometers from the terminus of the line at Tokyo Station.

== Station layout ==
The station has two opposed side platforms connected to the station building by a footbridge. The station is unattended.

=== Platforms ===
1	■ Tōhoku Main Line	for Ichinoseki
2	■ Tōhoku Main Line	for Kogota and Sendai

== History ==
Shimizuhara Station opened on 1 July 1955. The station was absorbed into the JR East network upon the privatization of the Japanese National Railways (JNR) on 1 April 1987.

== Surrounding area ==
- National Route 342

== See also ==
- List of railway stations in Japan
