= Yagoshi Station =

Railway station in Ichinoseki, Iwate Prefecture, Japan

Yagoshi Station 矢越駅
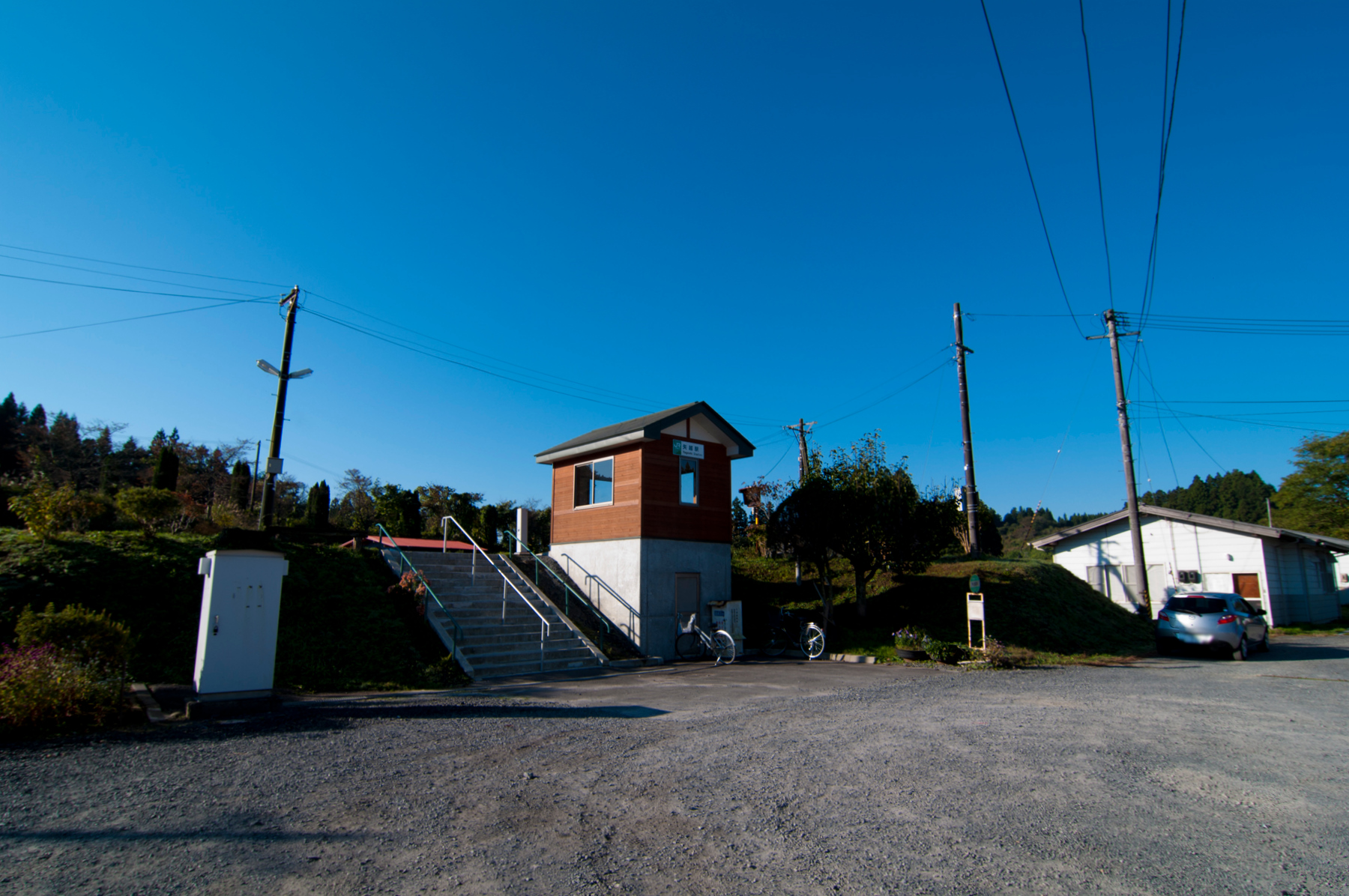
- Yagoshi Station in October 2010

General information
- Location: Murone-cho Yagoshi-aze Gotanda 57, Ichinoseki-shi, Iwate-ken 029-1202; Japan
- Coordinates: 38.9352°N 141.4290°E
- Operator: JR East
- Line: ■ Ōfunato Line
- Distance: 47.6 km from Ichinoseki
- Platforms: 1 side platform

Other information
- Status: Unstaffed
- Website: Official website

History
- Opened: September 2, 1928

Services
Preceding station	JR East	Following station
Konashi towards Ichinoseki	Ōfunato Line	Orikabe towards Kesennuma
Location
- Location within Iwate Prefecture Location within Japan

Yagoshi Station (矢越駅, Yagoshi-eki) is a railway station located in the city of Ichinoseki, Iwate Prefecture, Japan, operated by the East Japan Railway Company (JR East).

== Lines ==
Yagoshi Station is served by the Ōfunato Line, and is located 47.6 rail kilometers from the terminus of the line at Ichinoseki Station.

== Station layout ==
The station has one side platform serving a single bi-directional track. The station is unattended.

== History ==
Yagoshi Station opened on September 2, 1928. The station was absorbed into the JR East network upon the privatization of the Japan National Railways (JNR) on April 1, 1987. A new station building was completed in March 2005.

== Surrounding area ==
- National Route 284
- Hikobae Forest

== See also ==
- List of railway stations in Japan
