= Shuko Junior College =

Coordinates: 38°54′50.2″N 141°6′37.7″E

- Established: 1953.
- Address: Iwate, Japan

Shuko Junior College (修紅短期大学, Shūkō tanki daigaku) is a private junior college in Ichinoseki, Iwate, Japan, chartered in 1953. The predecessor of the school was founded in 1899.
