= Rhodinia verecunda =

Scientific classification
- Kingdom: Animalia
- Phylum: Arthropoda
- Class: Insecta
- Order: Lepidoptera
- Family: Saturniidae
- Genus: Rhodinia
- Species: R. verecunda

Binomial name
- Rhodinia verecunda Inoue, 1984

Species of moth

Rhodinia verecunda is an endemic moth species belonging to the genus Rhodinia of the family Saturniidae. It is endemic to Taiwan.

== Discovery ==
The species Rhodinia verecunda was described in 1984 by Inoue Hiroshi. It is known that the first specimen came from the record, Mt. Nengkao/2000 m/Nantou/Formosa/VIII. 1961/ex T. Shimonoya, in Nantou County, Taiwan. It is also the first moth specimen from a mountain area 2,000 m (6,600 ft) above sea level to be discovered post World War II. The male holotype specimen is currently deposited at the Natural History Museum in London.

== Distribution and the emergence period ==
Besides the type specimens, there are no other existing specimens or citizen science image records of this Taiwanese endemic species, Rhodinia verecunda, occurring as adults from November to January of the following year. Based on the known ecological habits of genus worldwide, it is clear that they are a typical group of adults that only occur in winter. Therefore, it can be reasonably inferred that the actual collection month for the reference specimen is unlikely to be August.

== Larva feeding habits ==
The larvae feed on Celtis sinensis, Ring-cupped Oak, Quercus acutissima, Quercus aliena, and Cyclobalanopsis stenophylloides.
