= Higashiiwai District, Iwate =

Former district in Iwate prefecture, Japan

Coordinates: 38°56′05″N 141°07′36″E

- Japan > Tōhoku region > Iwate Prefecture > Higashiiwai District

Higashiiwai (東磐井郡, Higashiiwai-gun) was a district located in Iwate Prefecture, Japan.

As of September 1, 2005, the district had an estimated population of 10,026. The total area was 123.15 km^{2}.

The day before the dissolution on September 25, 2011, the district had only one town.

- Fujisawa

On September 26, 2011, the town of Fujisawa was merged with the expanded city of Ichinoseki. Higashiiwai District was dissolved as a result of this merger.

== post-WWII timeline ==
- January 1, 1955 - The village of Maikawa was merged with the villages of Ganmi, Hagisho and Yasaka (from Nishiiwai District), and the old city of Ichinoseki (1st) to create the new and expanded city of Ichinoseki (2nd).
- February 1, 1955 - The villages of Tagawatsu and Nagasaka were merged to create the town of Higashiyama.
- April 1, 1955
  - The town of Fujisawa, the villages of Yasawa, Oumi and parts of Otsuho (the localities of Otaki and Horowa) were merged to create the town of Fujisawa.
  - The villages of Orikabe, Yakoshi and the remaining parts of Otsuho were merged to create the village of Murone.
  - The village of Namabo was merged with the town of Maesawa, and the villages of Hakusan and Furushiro (from Isawa District) to create the town of Maesawa (in Isawa District).
  - The towns of Yokusawa and Ohara, and the villages of Sazawa, Shibutami and Kyoda were merged to create the town of Daitō.
- April 15, 1955 - The village of Nagashima was merged with the older town of Hiraizumi (from Nishiiwai District) to create the new town of Hiraizumi (from Nishiiwai District).
- September 30, 1956
  - The villages of Kamoi and Kadozaki were merged to create the village of Kawasaki.
  - The town of Senmaya was merged with the villages of Konashi, Okutama, and Iwashimuzu to create the town of Senmaya.
- November 1, 1958 - The village of Matsukawa was merged into the village of Higashiyama and was elevated to town status.
- September 20, 2005 - The towns of Daitō, Higashiyama and Senmaya, and the villages of Kawasaki and Murone were merged with the town of Hanaizumi (from Nishiiwai District) and the old city of Ichinoseki (2nd) to create the new and expanded city of Ichinoseki (3rd).
- September 26, 2011 - The town of Fujisawa was merged into the expanded city of Ichinoseki. Higashiiwai District was dissolved as a result of this merger.
