= Kawai, Iwate =

Kawai 川井村
- Former municipality
- Flag Emblem

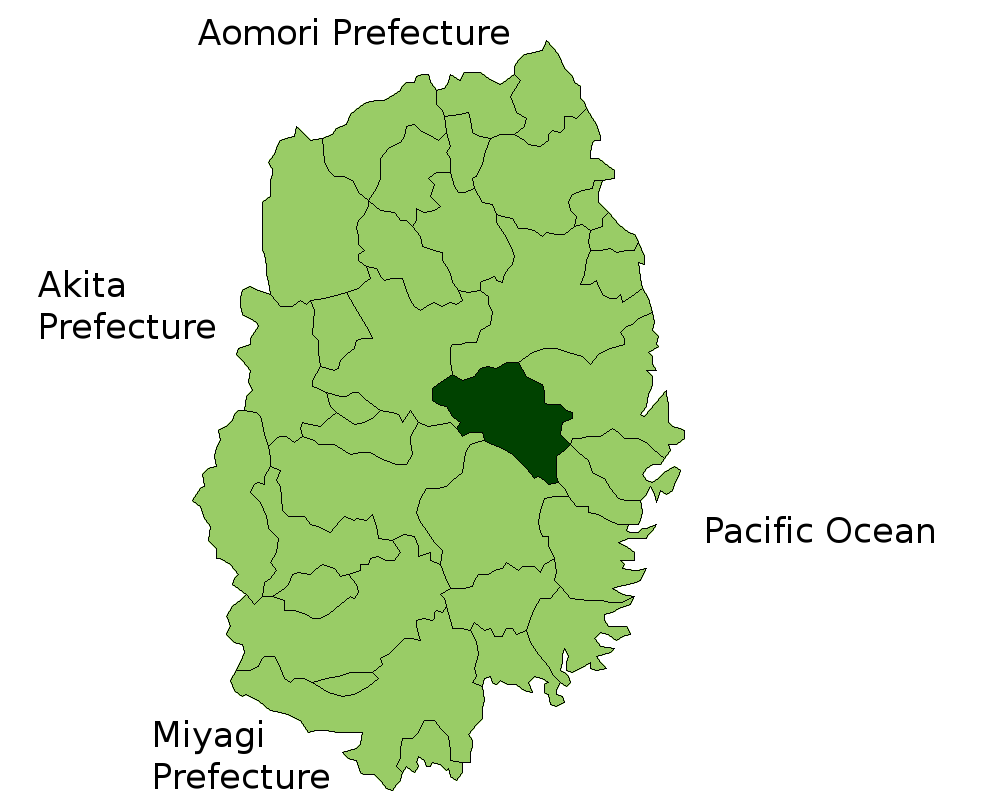
- Location of Kawai in Iwate Prefecture

- Location in Japan
- Coordinates: 39.600°N 141.683°E
- Country: Japan
- Region: Tōhoku
- Prefecture: Iwate Prefecture
- District: Shimohei District
- Merged: January 1, 2010 (now part of Miyako)

Area
  - Total: 567.07 km^{2} (218.95 sq mi)

Population (November 1, 2009)
  - Total: 2,952
  - Density: 5.2/km^{2} (13/sq mi)
- Time zone: UTC+09:00 (JST)
- Climate: Cfa
- Symbols
- Bird: Copper pheasant
- Flower: Azalea
- Tree: Betula pendula

Kawai (川井村, Kawai-mura) was a village located in Shimohei District, Iwate Prefecture, Japan.

== History ==
The village of Kawai was created on April 1, 1889, within Nakahei District with the establishment of the municipalities system. Nakahei was merged with Higashihei and Kitahei districts to form Shimohei District on March 29, 1896. On July 1, 1955, Kawai annexed the neighboring village of Oguni.

On January 1, 2010, Kawai was merged into the expanded city of Miyako, and no longer exists as an independent municipality.

As of January 1, 2006, the village had an estimated population of 2,952 and a population density of 5.2 persons per km^{2}. The total area was 563.07 km^{2}.

== Climate ==
Climate data for Kawai (1991−2020 normals, extremes 1977−present)
Month	Jan	Feb	Mar	Apr	May	Jun	Jul	Aug	Sep	Oct	Nov	Dec	Year
Record high °C (°F)	14.6 (58.3)	18.6 (65.5)	21.7 (71.1)	29.9 (85.8)	34.3 (93.7)	35.4 (95.7)	36.5 (97.7)	37.5 (99.5)	35.1 (95.2)	29.3 (84.7)	25.2 (77.4)	20.9 (69.6)	37.5 (99.5)
Mean daily maximum °C (°F)	2.9 (37.2)	3.8 (38.8)	8.0 (46.4)	14.8 (58.6)	20.5 (68.9)	23.5 (74.3)	26.8 (80.2)	28.0 (82.4)	24.1 (75.4)	18.3 (64.9)	12.3 (54.1)	5.7 (42.3)	15.7 (60.3)
Daily mean °C (°F)	−1.1 (30.0)	−0.6 (30.9)	2.9 (37.2)	8.7 (47.7)	14.1 (57.4)	17.8 (64.0)	21.5 (70.7)	22.4 (72.3)	18.4 (65.1)	12.2 (54.0)	6.6 (43.9)	1.4 (34.5)	10.4 (50.6)
Mean daily minimum °C (°F)	−4.9 (23.2)	−4.8 (23.4)	−1.8 (28.8)	3.0 (37.4)	8.3 (46.9)	13.0 (55.4)	17.5 (63.5)	18.4 (65.1)	14.4 (57.9)	7.5 (45.5)	1.7 (35.1)	−2.3 (27.9)	5.8 (42.5)
Record low °C (°F)	−15.4 (4.3)	−17.7 (0.1)	−12.4 (9.7)	−5.0 (23.0)	−1.5 (29.3)	1.7 (35.1)	8.6 (47.5)	8.8 (47.8)	2.5 (36.5)	−2.3 (27.9)	−6.7 (19.9)	−12.6 (9.3)	−17.7 (0.1)
Average precipitation mm (inches)	46.0 (1.81)	40.7 (1.60)	74.9 (2.95)	85.1 (3.35)	94.0 (3.70)	104.9 (4.13)	158.8 (6.25)	176.7 (6.96)	168.1 (6.62)	131.3 (5.17)	70.6 (2.78)	61.0 (2.40)	1,221.2 (48.08)
Average precipitation days (≥ 1.0 mm)	7.1	6.5	9.4	10.2	10.7	9.4	12.6	11.3	12.0	9.4	9.4	8.0	116
Mean monthly sunshine hours	122.1	124.8	158.2	183.0	199.0	168.9	148.3	155.0	132.1	141.9	127.0	112.2	1,775.5
Source: JMA
