= Kawasaki, Iwate =

Kawasaki 川崎村
- Former municipality
- Flag Emblem

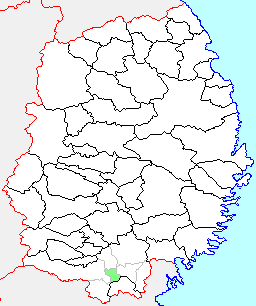
- Location of Kawasaki in Iwate Prefecture

- Location in Japan
- Coordinates: 38°54′4.1″N 141°15′50.5″E
- Country: Japan
- Region: Tōhoku
- Prefecture: Iwate Prefecture
- District: Higashiiwai
- Merged: September 20, 2005 (now part of Ichinoseki)

Area
  - Total: 42.49 km^{2} (16.41 sq mi)

Population (September 1, 2005)
  - Total: 4,384
  - Density: 103.18/km^{2} (267.2/sq mi)
- Time zone: UTC+09:00 (JST)
- Symbols
- Bird: Green pheasant
- Flower: Chrysanthemum
- Tree: Prunus mume

Kawasaki (川崎村, Kawasaki-mura) was a village located in Higashiiwai District, Iwate Prefecture, Japan. The village was famous for the annual Firework Festival in August and the E-Boat Race in early September.

Kawasaki village was created on September 30, 1956 by the merger of the villages of Usuginu and Kadozaki. On September 20, 2005, Kawasaki, along with the towns of Daitō, Higashiyama and Senmaya, the village of Murone (all from Higashiiwai District), and the town of Hanaizumi (from Nishiiwai District), was merged into the expanded city of Ichinoseki, and no longer exists as an independent municipality.

As of September 2005, the village had an estimated population of 4,384 and a population density of 103.18 persons per km^{2}. The total area was 42.49 km^{2}.
