= Senmaya, Iwate =

Senmaya 千厩町
- Former municipality
- Flag Emblem

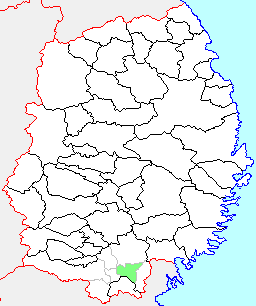
- Location of Senmaya in Iwate Prefecture

- Location in Japan
- Coordinates: 38°56′13″N 141°19′53″E
- Country: Japan
- Region: Tōhoku
- Prefecture: Iwate Prefecture
- District: Higashiiwai
- Merged: September 20, 2005 (now part of Ichinoseki)

Area
  - Total: 89.84 km^{2} (34.69 sq mi)

Population (September 1, 2005)
  - Total: 12,969
  - Density: 144.36/km^{2} (373.9/sq mi)
- Time zone: UTC+09:00 (JST)
- Climate: Cfa
- Symbols
- Bird: Japanese bush warbler
- Flower: Lilium auratum
- Tree: Pinus densiflora

Senmaya (千厩町, Senmaya-chō) is a town located in Higashiiwai District, Iwate Prefecture, Japan. The name translates as 'one thousand stables' although today there are no horses or stables remaining.

Senmaya village was created on April 1, 1889 with the establishment of the municipalities system. It was raised to town status on April 1, 1898. On September 30, 1956, Senmaya annexed the neighboring villages of Iwashimizu, Okutama and Konashi. On September 20, 2005, Senmaya, along with the towns of Daitō and Higashiyama, the villages of Kawasaki and Murone (all from Higashiiwai District), and the town of Hanaizumi (from Nishiiwai District), was merged into the expanded city of Ichinoseki and no longer exists as an independent municipality.

As of September 2005, the town had an estimated population of 12,969 and a population density of 144.36 persons per km^{2}. The total area was 89.84 km^{2}.

== Climate ==
Climate data for Senmaya (1991−2020 normals, extremes 1976−present)
Month	Jan	Feb	Mar	Apr	May	Jun	Jul	Aug	Sep	Oct	Nov	Dec	Year
Record high °C (°F)	14.4 (57.9)	17.6 (63.7)	22.3 (72.1)	30.8 (87.4)	33.0 (91.4)	34.0 (93.2)	36.0 (96.8)	36.4 (97.5)	35.4 (95.7)	27.9 (82.2)	23.8 (74.8)	20.6 (69.1)	36.4 (97.5)
Mean daily maximum °C (°F)	3.3 (37.9)	4.4 (39.9)	8.6 (47.5)	15.0 (59.0)	20.4 (68.7)	23.6 (74.5)	27.0 (80.6)	28.3 (82.9)	24.5 (76.1)	18.6 (65.5)	12.3 (54.1)	5.9 (42.6)	16.0 (60.8)
Daily mean °C (°F)	−0.9 (30.4)	−0.2 (31.6)	3.2 (37.8)	8.8 (47.8)	14.3 (57.7)	18.3 (64.9)	22.0 (71.6)	23.2 (73.8)	19.3 (66.7)	13.0 (55.4)	6.6 (43.9)	1.4 (34.5)	10.8 (51.3)
Mean daily minimum °C (°F)	−5.1 (22.8)	−4.7 (23.5)	−2.1 (28.2)	2.5 (36.5)	8.4 (47.1)	13.7 (56.7)	18.3 (64.9)	19.4 (66.9)	15.2 (59.4)	7.9 (46.2)	1.4 (34.5)	−2.7 (27.1)	6.0 (42.8)
Record low °C (°F)	−18.3 (−0.9)	−16.8 (1.8)	−13.7 (7.3)	−5.9 (21.4)	−1.1 (30.0)	3.3 (37.9)	8.4 (47.1)	10.6 (51.1)	3.2 (37.8)	−2.3 (27.9)	−6.5 (20.3)	−15.8 (3.6)	−18.3 (−0.9)
Average precipitation mm (inches)	37.0 (1.46)	31.6 (1.24)	67.8 (2.67)	82.2 (3.24)	98.1 (3.86)	115.8 (4.56)	173.4 (6.83)	149.6 (5.89)	147.2 (5.80)	113.3 (4.46)	61.5 (2.42)	45.9 (1.81)	1,123.2 (44.22)
Average precipitation days (≥ 1.0 mm)	7.7	7.4	8.9	9.1	10.1	9.8	12.4	11.5	11.5	10.1	8.4	8.5	115.4
Mean monthly sunshine hours	139.2	143.4	170.4	187.1	188.1	147.9	130.2	144.8	130.4	144.3	135.6	119.2	1,780.7
Source: JMA
