= Ichinoseki =

Ichinoseki 一関市
- City
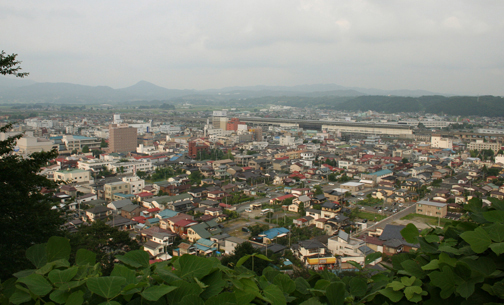
- Ichinoseki Skyline

- Flag Seal

- Coordinates: 38°56′5″N 141°07′35.7″E
- Country: Japan
- Region: Tōhoku
- Prefecture: Iwate

Area
  - Total: 1,256.42 km^{2} (485.11 sq mi)

Population (2025)
  - Total: 101,916
  - Density: 81.1162/km^{2} (210.090/sq mi)
- Time zone: Japan Standard Time
- Phone number: 0191-21-2111
- Address: 7-2 Takeyama-chō, Ichinoseki-shi, Iwate-ken 021-8501
- Climate: Cfa
- Website: Official website
- Symbols
- Bird: Japanese bush warbler
- Flower: Canola
- Tree: Japanese beech

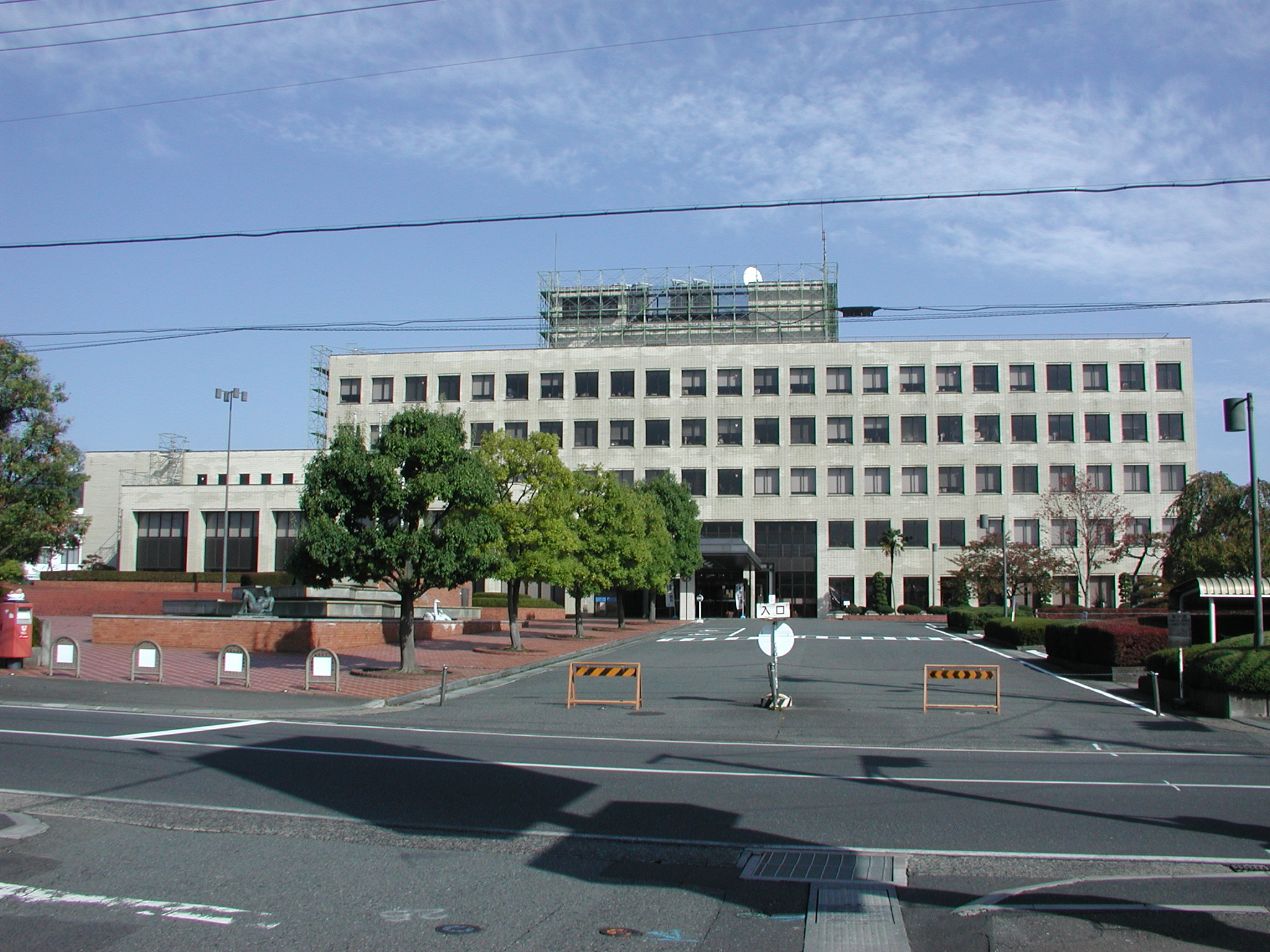
Ichinoseki City Office

Ichinoseki (一関市, Ichinoseki-shi; Japanese pronunciation: [ì.c̟͡ɕí.nó̞.sè̞.k̟ʲì, -sé̞.k̟ʲi̥.ɕì]) is a city located in Iwate Prefecture, in the Tōhoku region of northern Japan. As of 1 May 2020, the city had a population of 114,476 and a population density of 91 persons per km^{2} in 46,375 households. It is currently the second largest city by population in the prefecture, after Morioka. The total area of the city was 1,256.42 square kilometers (485.11 sq mi).

== Geography ==
Ichinoseki is located inland in the south of Iwate Prefecture, a little over two hours north of Tokyo by the Tōhoku Shinkansen. A large volume of extremely stable granite rock runs beneath the city, and is the center of a site being promoted as a suitable location for construction of the International Linear Collider (ILC).

=== Neighboring municipalities ===
Akita Prefecture

- Higashinaruse

Iwate Prefecture

- Hiraizumi
- Ōshū
- Rikuzentakata
- Sumita

Miyagi Prefecture

- Kesennuma
- Kurihara
- Tome

== Climate ==
Ichinoseki has a humid subtropical climate (Köppen climate classification Cfa) with warm summers and cold winters. The average annual temperature in Ichinoseki is 10.9 °C. The average annual rainfall is 1248 mm with September as the wettest month and January as the driest month. The temperatures are highest on average in August, at around 24.3 °C, and lowest in January, at around -1.5 °C.

Climate data for Ichinoseki (elevation 32 m, 1991–2020 normals, extremes 1976–present)
Month	Jan	Feb	Mar	Apr	May	Jun	Jul	Aug	Sep	Oct	Nov	Dec	Year
Record high °C (°F)	13.6 (56.5)	18.3 (64.9)	23.9 (75.0)	31.4 (88.5)	34.8 (94.6)	35.3 (95.5)	38.3 (100.9)	38.2 (100.8)	36.6 (97.9)	30.5 (86.9)	23.2 (73.8)	21.4 (70.5)	38.3 (100.9)
Mean daily maximum °C (°F)	3.8 (38.8)	5.1 (41.2)	9.5 (49.1)	16.0 (60.8)	21.5 (70.7)	24.7 (76.5)	27.9 (82.2)	29.3 (84.7)	25.3 (77.5)	19.3 (66.7)	12.7 (54.9)	6.1 (43.0)	16.8 (62.2)
Daily mean °C (°F)	−0.1 (31.8)	0.6 (33.1)	4.1 (39.4)	9.8 (49.6)	15.4 (59.7)	19.4 (66.9)	23.0 (73.4)	24.2 (75.6)	20.4 (68.7)	14.0 (57.2)	7.6 (45.7)	2.1 (35.8)	11.7 (53.1)
Mean daily minimum °C (°F)	−3.6 (25.5)	−3.3 (26.1)	−0.8 (30.6)	4.0 (39.2)	10.1 (50.2)	15.2 (59.4)	19.4 (66.9)	20.6 (69.1)	16.5 (61.7)	9.5 (49.1)	3.0 (37.4)	−1.4 (29.5)	7.5 (45.5)
Record low °C (°F)	−14.4 (6.1)	−15.2 (4.6)	−10.3 (13.5)	−4.6 (23.7)	1.0 (33.8)	5.3 (41.5)	6.3 (43.3)	11.6 (52.9)	6.0 (42.8)	−0.9 (30.4)	−7.3 (18.9)	−12.6 (9.3)	−15.2 (4.6)
Average precipitation mm (inches)	46.5 (1.83)	40.1 (1.58)	76.1 (3.00)	86.6 (3.41)	107.5 (4.23)	121.8 (4.80)	181.1 (7.13)	161.9 (6.37)	156.3 (6.15)	118.6 (4.67)	68.2 (2.69)	58.7 (2.31)	1,211.6 (47.70)
Average snowfall cm (inches)	57 (22)	52 (20)	15 (5.9)	2 (0.8)	0 (0)	0 (0)	0 (0)	0 (0)	0 (0)	0 (0)	3 (1.2)	40 (16)	166 (65)
Average precipitation days (≥ 1.0 mm)	9.7	8.7	9.6	9.0	10.0	10.1	13.0	11.6	11.1	9.7	8.9	10.6	121.7
Mean monthly sunshine hours	115.6	124.4	163.0	178.0	183.8	138.3	117.7	132.6	117.7	131.9	125.5	108.7	1,643.5
Source: Japan Meteorological Agency (1991–2020 normals, extremes 1976–present)

Climate data for Senmaya, Ichinoseki (elevation 120 m, 1991–2020 normals, extremes 1976–present)
Month	Jan	Feb	Mar	Apr	May	Jun	Jul	Aug	Sep	Oct	Nov	Dec	Year
Record high °C (°F)	14.4 (57.9)	18.3 (64.9)	22.3 (72.1)	30.8 (87.4)	33.0 (91.4)	34.0 (93.2)	37.0 (98.6)	36.4 (97.5)	35.7 (96.3)	29.6 (85.3)	23.8 (74.8)	20.6 (69.1)	37.0 (98.6)
Mean daily maximum °C (°F)	3.3 (37.9)	4.4 (39.9)	8.6 (47.5)	15.0 (59.0)	20.4 (68.7)	23.6 (74.5)	27.0 (80.6)	28.3 (82.9)	24.5 (76.1)	18.6 (65.5)	12.3 (54.1)	5.9 (42.6)	16.0 (60.8)
Daily mean °C (°F)	−0.9 (30.4)	−0.2 (31.6)	3.2 (37.8)	8.8 (47.8)	14.3 (57.7)	18.3 (64.9)	22.0 (71.6)	23.2 (73.8)	19.3 (66.7)	13.0 (55.4)	6.6 (43.9)	1.4 (34.5)	10.7 (51.3)
Mean daily minimum °C (°F)	−5.1 (22.8)	−4.7 (23.5)	−2.1 (28.2)	2.5 (36.5)	8.4 (47.1)	13.7 (56.7)	18.3 (64.9)	19.4 (66.9)	15.2 (59.4)	7.9 (46.2)	1.4 (34.5)	−2.7 (27.1)	6.0 (42.8)
Record low °C (°F)	−18.3 (−0.9)	−16.8 (1.8)	−13.7 (7.3)	−5.9 (21.4)	−1.1 (30.0)	3.3 (37.9)	8.4 (47.1)	10.6 (51.1)	3.2 (37.8)	−2.3 (27.9)	−6.5 (20.3)	−15.8 (3.6)	−18.3 (−0.9)
Average precipitation mm (inches)	37.0 (1.46)	31.6 (1.24)	67.8 (2.67)	82.2 (3.24)	98.1 (3.86)	115.8 (4.56)	173.4 (6.83)	149.6 (5.89)	147.2 (5.80)	113.3 (4.46)	61.5 (2.42)	45.9 (1.81)	1,123.2 (44.22)
Average precipitation days (≥ 1.0 mm)	7.7	7.4	8.9	9.1	10.1	9.8	12.4	11.5	11.5	10.1	8.4	8.5	115.3
Mean monthly sunshine hours	139.2	143.4	170.4	187.1	188.1	147.9	130.2	144.8	130.4	144.3	135.6	119.2	1,780.7
Source: Japan Meteorological Agency (1991–2020 normals, extremes 1976–present)

== Demographics ==
The agricultural makeup of the city outside the centre is mostly composed of farmers, leading to an influx of Chinese and Filipino immigrants due to marriage. As a result, Ichinoseki has a varied ethnic makeup, although the newcomers still remain a small minority.

Per Japanese census data, the population of Ichinoseki peaked in the 1950s and has declined over the past 70 years. Ichinoseki has been recognized by Japan's Office for the Promotion of Regional Revitalization (Kishida Cabinet Secretariat), which promotes the development of new technologies to combat depopulation, for meeting a "high standard" of digital transformation/telework infrastructure. Related projects have been awarded over ¥80M in government grants.

Historical population
Year	Pop.	±%
1920	118,556	—
1930	131,447	+10.9%
1940	135,612	+3.2%
1950	170,515	+25.7%
1960	168,768	−1.0%
1970	150,366	−10.9%
1980	147,465	−1.9%
1990	144,896	−1.7%
2000	140,825	−2.8%
2010	127,642	−9.4%
2020	111,932	−12.3%

== History ==
The area of present-day Ichinoseki was part of ancient Mutsu Province, and has been settled since at least the Japanese Paleolithic period. The area was inhabited by the Emishi people, and came under the control of the imperial dynasty during the early Heian period. During the Heian period, it was controlled by the Abe clan, followed by the Northern Fujiwara clan of Hiraizumi. During the Sengoku period, the area was dominated by various samurai clans before coming under the control of the Date clan during the Edo period, who ruled Sendai Domain under the Tokugawa shogunate. A portion of the present city was part of Ichinoseki Domain, a sub-domain of Sendai Domain.

The town of Ichinoseki was established within Nishiiwai District, Iwate on April 1, 1889 with the establishment of the modern municipality system. It was raised to city status on April 1, 1948 by the merger of the towns of Ichinoseki and Yamame with the villages of Mataki and Nakasato.

- January 1, 1955 - Ichinoseki absorbed the villages of Genbi, Hagisho, Maikawa, and Yasakae
- September 1, 1956 - Due to a boundary adjustment, the city absorbed parts of the town of Hiraizumi.
- May 1, 1964 - Due to a boundary adjustment, the city absorbed more of the town of Hiraizumi.
- September 20, 2005 - the towns of Daitō, Higashiyama and Senmaya, the villages of Kawasaki and Murone (all from Higashiiwai District), and the town of Hanaizumi (from Nishiiwai District) were merged with the city of Ichinoseki, which approximately doubled the old city's population and nearly tripled its size.
- September 26, 2011 - the town of Fujisawa (also from Higashiiwai District) was merged into Ichinoseki. Higashiiwai District was dissolved as a result of this merger.

== Government ==
Ichinoseki has a mayor-council form of government with a directly elected mayor and a unicameral city council of 25 members. Ichinoseki and the town of Hiraizumi collectively contribute five seats to the Iwate Prefectural legislature. In terms of national politics, the city is part of Iwate 3rd district of the lower house of the Diet of Japan.

== Education ==
Ichinoseki has 29 public elementary schools and 16 public junior high schools operated by the city government and one junior high school and eight public elementary schools operated by the Iwate Prefectural Board of Education. There is also one private high school and one private junior college. The Prefecture also operates one special education school for the handicapped.

Extended content

=== Special school ===
- 岩手県立一関清明支援学校

=== Elementary schools ===
- Akoogi Elementary School (一関市立赤荻小学校)
- Ichinoseki Elementary School (一関市立一関小学校)
- Genbi Elementary School (一関市立厳美小学校)
- Takizawa Elementary School (一関市立滝沢小学校)
- 一関市立達古袋小学校
- Nakasato Elementary School (一関市立中里小学校)
- Hagisho Elementary School (一関市立萩荘小学校)
- 一関市立本寺小学校
- Maikawa Elementary School (一関市立舞川小学校)
- Minami Elementary School (一関市立南小学校)
- Yasakae Elementary School (一関市立弥栄小学校)
- 一関市立山目小学校
- 一関市立老松小学校
- Kanasawa Elementary School (一関市立金澤小学校)
- Nagai Elementary School (一関市立永井小学校)
- Hanaizumi Elementary School (一関市立花泉小学校)
- 一関市立日形小学校
- Yushima Elementary School (一関市立油島小学校)
- 一関市立涌津小学校
- 一関市立内野小学校
- 一関市立大原小学校
- 一関市立興田小学校
- 一関市立猿沢小学校
- 一関市立渋民小学校
- 一関市立摺沢小学校
- 一関市立曽慶小学校
- Iwashimizu Elementary School (一関市立磐清水小学校)
- Okutama Elementary School (一関市立奥玉小学校)
- 一関市立清田小学校
- 一関市立小梨小学校
- Senmaya Elementary School (一関市立千厩小学校)
- Nagasaka Elementary School (一関市立長坂小学校)
- Takodu Elementary School 一関市立田河津小学校
- Matsukawa Elementary School (一関市立松川小学校)
- 一関市立折壁小学校
- 一関市立上折壁小学校
- 一関市立釘子小学校
- 一関市立津谷川小学校
- Yokosawa Elementary School (一関市立浜横沢小学校)
- Usugi Elementary School (一関市立薄衣小学校)
- 一関市立門崎小学校

=== Junior high schools ===
- 岩手県立一関第一高等学校付属中学校
- Ichinoseki Junior High School (一関市立一関中学校)
- Genbi Junior High School 一関市立厳美中学校
- Sakuramachi Junior High School (一関市立桜町中学校)
- Nakasato Junior High School (一関市立中里中学校)
- Hagisho Junior High School (一関市立萩荘中学校)
- Hondera Junior High School (一関市立本寺中学校)
- Maikawa Junior High School (一関市立舞川中学校)
- Mataki Junior High School (一関市立真滝中学校)
- Yasakae Junior High School (一関市立弥栄中学校)
- Yamanome Junior High School (一関市立山目中学校)
- Hanaizumi Junior High School (一関市立花泉中学校)
- Ohara Junior High School (一関市立大原中学校)
- 一関市立興田中学校
- 一関市立猿沢中学校
- Daito Elementary School (一関市立大東中学校)
- Senmaya Junior High School (一関市立千厩中学校)
- Higashiyama Junior High School (一関市立東山中学校)
- Murone Junior High School (一関市立室根中学校)
- Kawasaki Junior High School (一関市立川崎中学校)

=== High schools ===
- Ichinoseki Gakuin High School (一関学院高等学校)
- Ichinoseki Shuko High School (一関修紅高等学校) (also has a preschool and a university)
- Ichinoseki No. 1 High School (岩手県立一関第一高等学校)
- Ichinoseki No. 2 High School (岩手県立一関第二高等学校)
- Hanaizumi High School (岩手県立花泉高等学校)
- Daito High School (岩手県立大東高等学校)
- Senmaya High School (岩手県立千厩高等学校)
- Ichinoseki Tech High School (岩手県立一関工業高等学校)

=== Kosen ===
- Ichinoseki National College of Technology (一関工業高等専門学校)

=== Junior college ===
- Shuko Junior College

== Transportation ==
=== Railway ===
East Japan Railway Company (JR East) - Tōhoku Shinkansen

- Ichinoseki

East Japan Railway Company (JR East) - Tōhoku Main Line

- Yushima - Hanaizumi - Shimizuhara - (Arikabe) - Ichinoseki - Yamanome

East Japan Railway Company (JR East) - Ōfunato Line

- Ichinoseki - Mataki - Rikuchū-Kanzaki - Iwanoshita- Rikuchū-Matsukawa - Geibikei - Shibajuku - Surisawa - Senmaya - Konashi - Yagoshi - Orikabe - Niitsuki

=== Highway ===
- Tōhoku Expressway
- National Route 4
- National Route 284
- National Route 342
- National Route 343
- National Route 346
- National Route 456
- National Route 457

== Local attractions ==
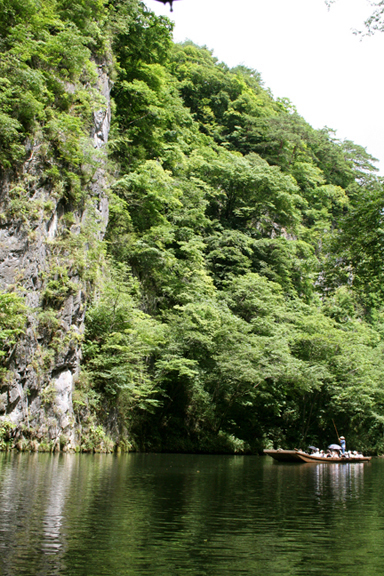
Geibikei Gorge, Ichinoseki

- Geibikei is a dramatic river gorge which offers rides in traditional flat-bottomed boats, navigated by singing "gondoliers".
- Genbikei is another popular river area with naturally carved cliffs.
- Honederamura Shōen ruins has been designated an Important Cultural Landscape and a National Historic Site. A brochure can be seen here. http://www.ichitabi.jp/guidebook/pdf/guidebook_04_03_en.pdf
- Ichinoseki is in close proximity to the historically significant site of Hiraizumi, which lies adjacent to the mid-northern border of the city. Ichinoseki station is a convenient transit hub for excursions to Hiraizumi, with access to Tōhoku Shinkansen and local rail lines.

== Sister cities ==
=== International relations ===
- Central Highlands Regional Council, Queensland, Australia.

=== Friendship cities ===
- (Japan) Miharu (Tamura District, Fukushima Prefecture)
  - Signed between the former city of Ichinoseki on August 8, 1987
- (Japan) Kesennuma (Miyagi Prefecture)
  - Signed between the former cities of Ichinoseki and Kesennuma on May 1, 1997
  - Signed between the former city of Kesennuma and former town of Murone on May 8, 2003
- (Japan) Tanabe (Wakayama Prefecture)
  - Signed between the former village of Murone and the town of Hongu on August 8, 1987
- (Japan) Yoshikawa (Saitama Prefecture)
  - Signed by the former village of Murone on April 15, 1997

== Notable people from Ichinoseki ==
- Miyagiyama Fukumatsu, sumo wrestler
- Keiko Fuji, singer/actress
- Shota Kimura, baseball player
- Takahira Kogorō, diplomat
- Ayaka Komatsu, model/actress
- Masato Onodera, professional wrestler
- Shota Onodera, basketball player
- Yuumi Shida, model/actress
