= Tarō, Iwate =

Tarō 田老町
- Former municipality
- Flag Emblem

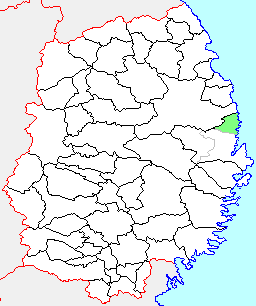
- Location of Tarō in Iwate Prefecture

- Location in Japan
- Coordinates: 39°43′56″N 141°58′6″E
- Country: Japan
- Region: Tōhoku
- Prefecture: Iwate Prefecture
- District: Shimohei
- Merged: June 6, 2005 (now part of Miyako)

Area
  - Total: 101.05 km^{2} (39.02 sq mi)

Population (June 1, 2005)
  - Total: 4,570
  - Density: 45.2/km^{2} (117/sq mi)
- Time zone: UTC+09:00 (JST)
- Symbols
- Bird: Black-tailed gull
- Flower: Lilium maculatum
- Tree: Pinus densiflora

Tarō (田老町, Tarō-chō) was a town located in Shimohei District, Iwate Prefecture in Japan. Today it is part of the city of Miyako.

== History ==
The village of Tarō was created on April 1, 1889, within Higashihei District with the establishment of the municipality system. Higashihei merged with the Kitahei and Nakahei Districts to form Shimohei District on March 29, 1896. Tarō was raised to town status on April 1, 1944.

On June 6, 2005, Tarō, along with the village of Niisato (also from Shimohei District), merged into the expanded city of Miyako and no longer exists as an independent municipality.

In June 2005, the town had an estimated population of 4,679 and a population density of 46.3 persons per km^{2}. The total area was 101.05 km^{2}.

The former town is located to the east of the prefectural capital Morioka and north of the regional center Miyako with which it has now merged. The area has a rugged coastline to the east, which is a part of Sanriku ria Coast. The main local industry is commercial fishing.

The town had been destroyed a number of times due to tsunami incidents all throughout its history. One of the earliest recorded was in December 1611, but was later followed by similar tsunamis in June 1896 (with 1,859 recorded deaths) and March 1933 (with 911 recorded deaths). Due to its history of repeated destruction by tsunamis, two layers of seawalls in the form of an X-shaped structure were constructed. The seawalls had two joined sections forming seaward and landward levees, and ran to a total of 2.4 km (1.5 mi) long. It was known as a Banri no Chojo: Japanese for "Great Wall of China."

The 10 m (33 ft) high seawalls were completed in 1958 after 30 years of work to protect Tarō. The seawalls, which could theoretically stop breaking waves up to 8 metres (26 ft) high, were designed to divert tsunamis to the side around the town using channels and river dykes. Local municipal agencies regularly carried out annual tsunami drills simulating an emergency, wherein volunteers would close the seawall gates and residents would go to muster points above the town. The system worked well when a tsunami from the 1960 Valdivia earthquake in Chile struck the town, resulting in zero lives lost in Tarō.

=== 2011 Tōhoku earthquake and tsunami ===
After years of success, the seawalls failed when tsunami waves estimated at 12 metres (39 ft) to 15 metres (49 ft) high struck Tarō following the earthquake and tsunami on March 11, 2011. Survivors said they saw some residents climb onto the sea defenses to watch the approaching tsunami only to be swept away when the waves went over the wall. Many in the town said they felt the wall lulled them into a false sense of security. A 500 m (1,600 ft) section of the seaside wall was swept away by the tsunami. Large amounts of concrete debris was left around Tarō and scattered in its bay. 181 people were dead or missing in the tsunami, with nearly 1,700 houses damaged or destroyed.

Four years after the tsunami, on 22 November 2015, a "town opening" ceremony was held in Tarō after the completion of 450 new houses. The new houses were built on higher ground some 40 to 60 meters above the sea level, as well as on ground that had been raised by about 2 meters. A few years later, an added 14.7-metre seawall was rebuilt in 2017. Even with these added precautions, the population of the town suffered, dropping to 3,173, which is around 70 percent of its total population in 2011.
