= Nishiiwai District, Iwate =

District in Iwate prefecture, Japan

Coordinates: 38.990248°N 141.093708°E

- Japan > Tōhoku region > Iwate Prefecture > Nishiiwai District

Location of Nishiiwai District in Iwate Prefecture

Nishiiwai (西磐井郡, Nishiiwai-gun) is a district located in Iwate Prefecture, Japan.

As of June 1, 2019, the district has an estimated population of 7,440 with a density of 117 inhabitants per square kilometre (300/sq mi). The total area is 63.39 km^{2} (24.48 sq mi).

After the third city of Ichinoseki creation on September 20, 2005, the district has only one town left.

- Hiraizumi

== Post-WWII timeline ==
- January 1, 1948 - The village of Yamame gained town status.
- April 1, 1948 - The town of Ichinoseki, Yamame, Nakasato, and Madaki merged to form the city of Ichinoseki (1st generation).
- October 1, 1953 - The village of Hiraizumi gained town status.
- January 1, 1955
  - The villages of Yasaka, Hagisho, and Ganmi merged with the village of Maikawa from Higashiiwai District and the city of Ichinoseki (1st generation) to form the city of Ichinoseki (2nd generation).
  - The village of Hanaizumi, Nagai, Dotsu, Aburajima, Oimatsu, and Higata merged to form the town of Hanaizumi.
- April 15, 1955 - The town of Hiraizumi merged with the village of Nagashima from Higashiiwai District to form the town of Hiraizumi.
- September 1, 1956 - The city of Ichinoseki (2nd generation) absorbed parts of the town of Hiraizumi.
- September 30, 1956 - The village of Kanazawa was merged into the town of Hanaizumi.
- May 1, 1964 - The city of Ichinoseki (2nd generation) absorbed parts of the town of Hiraizumi for the second time.
- September 20, 2005 - The town of Hanaizumi merged with the towns of Daitō, Higashiyama and Senmaya, and the villages of Kawasaki and Murone, all from Higashiiwai District, and the old city of Ichinoseki (2nd generation) to create the new city of Ichinoseki (3rd generation).
