= Murone, Iwate =

Murone 室根村
- Former municipality
- Flag Emblem

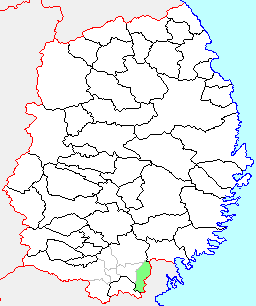
- Location of Murone in Iwate Prefecture

- Location in Japan
- Coordinates: 38°54′4.1″N 141°15′50.5″E
- Country: Japan
- Region: Tōhoku
- Prefecture: Iwate Prefecture
- District: Higashiiwai
- Merged: September 20, 2005 (now part of Ichinoseki)

Area
  - Total: 97.28 km^{2} (37.56 sq mi)

Population (September 1, 2005)
  - Total: 5,886
  - Density: 60.5/km^{2} (157/sq mi)
- Time zone: UTC+09:00 (JST)
- Symbols
- Bird: Copper pheasant
- Flower: Azalea
- Tree: Cryptomeria

Murone (室根村, Murone-mura) was a village located in Higashiiwai District, Iwate Prefecture, Japan.

Murone village was created on April 1, 1955 by the merger of the villages of Yagoshi, Orikabe and a portion of the village of Otsubo. On September 20, 2005, Murone, along with the towns of Daitō, Higashiyama and Senmaya, the village of Kawasaki (all from Higashiiwai District), and the town of Hanaizumi (from Nishiiwai District), was merged into the expanded city of Ichinoseki, and no longer exists as an independent municipality.

As of September 2005, the village had an estimated population of 5,886 and a population density of 60.5 persons per km^{2}. The total area was 97.28 km^{2}.
