= Shimohei District, Iwate =

District in Iwate prefecture, Japan

Coordinates: 39°52′N 141°47′E

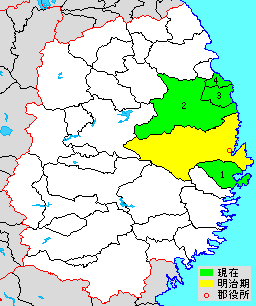
Map showing original extent of Shimohei District in Iwate Prefecture colored area=original extent in Meiji period; green=present area

Shimohei (下閉伊郡, Shimohei-gun) is a rural district in Iwate Prefecture, in the Tōhoku region of northern Japan. As of 1 June 2019, the district has an estimated population of 29,559 and a population density of 20 persons per km^{2}. The total area is 1,481.02 km^{2}.

Much of the city of Miyako was formerly within the district. There are two towns and two villages within the district.

- Iwaizumi
- Yamada
- Fudai
- Tanohata

== History ==
During the Edo period under the Tokugawa shogunate, the district was within Mutsu Province and was under the control of the Nanbu clan of Morioka Domain. In 1869, following the Meiji restoration, Mutsu Province was divided, with the area of Hei District becoming part of Rikuchū Province, and from 1872, part of Iwate Prefecture.

On January 4, 1879, Hei District was divided into five districts (Kitahei, Higashihei, Nishihei, Nakahei and Minamihei. However, on April 1, 1897, the three districts of Kitahei, Higashihei and Nakahei were merged to form Shimohei District, which was then reorganized into three towns (Miyako, Kuwagasaki and Yamada) and 25 villages.

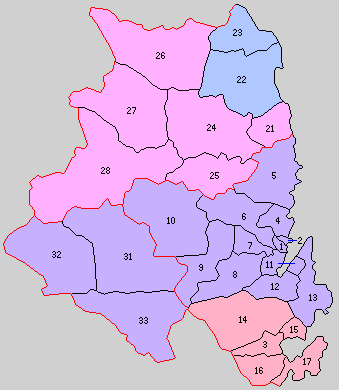
1. Miyako; 2. Kuwagasaki; 3.Yamada 4. Sakiyama; 5. Taro; 6. Yamaguchi; 7. Sentoku; 8. Hanawa; 9. Moichi: 10. Kariya; 11. Sokei; 12. Tsugaruishi; 13. Omoe; 14. Toyomane; 15. Osawa; 16. Orikasa; 17. Funagoshi: 21. Omoto; 22. Tanohata; 23. Fudai; 24. Iwaizumi; 25. Ugei; 26. Akka; 27. Kogawa; 28. Ogawa; 31. Kawai; 32. Kadoma; 33. Oguni; Purple = Miyako City; Orange= Yamada Town; Pink = Iwaizumi Town; Blue = no change

=== Subsequent timeline ===
- August 1, 1922 - The village of Iwaizumi elevated to town status (4 towns, 24 villages)
- April 1, 1924 - The towns of Miyako and Kuwgasaki merged. (3 towns, 24 villages)
- February 11, 1924 - The town of Miyako merged with the villages of Sokei, Yamaguchi and Sentoku, and elevated to city status. (2 towns, 21 villages)
- April 1, 1941 - The village of Taro was elevated to town status. (3 towns, 20 villages)
- February 1, 1955 - The village of Kariya and Moichi merged to form the village of Niisato. (3 towns, 19 villages)
- March 1, 1955 - The villages of Osawa, Orikasa, Toyomane and Funakoshi merged into the town of Yamada. (3 towns, 15 villages)
- April 1, 1955 - The villages of Sakiyama, Omoe, Tsugaruishi, Funakoshi merged with the city of Miyako (3 towns, 11 villages)
- July 1, 1955 - The villages of Kawai, Koguni and Kadoma merge to form the village of Kawai. (3 towns, 9 villages)
- September 30, 1956 - The villages of Akka, Ugei, Okawa and Omoto merged with the town of Iwaizumi. (3 towns, 5 villages)
- April 1, 1957 – The village of Kogawa merged with the town of Iwaizmi (3 towns, 4 villages)
- June 6, 2005: The town of Tarō and village of Niisato merged with the city of Miyako. (2 towns, 3 villages)
- January 1, 2010: The village of Kawai merged with the city of Miyako . (2 towns, 2 villages)
