= Yushima Station (Iwate) =

Railway station in Ichinoseki, Iwate Prefecture, Japan

Yushima Station 油島駅
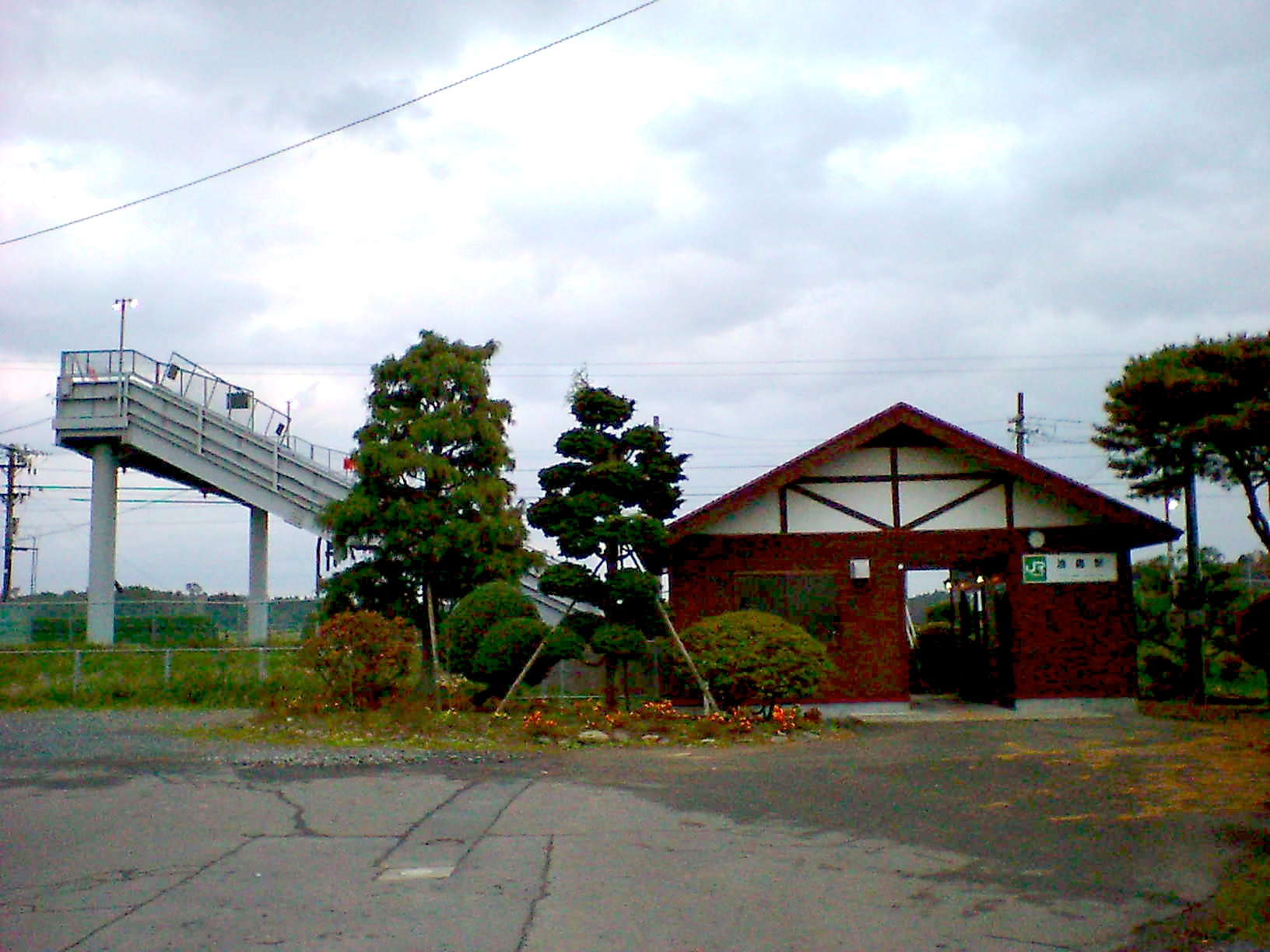
- Yushima Station, November 2005

General information
- Location: Hanaizumi-cho Yushima-aze, Ichinoseki-shi, Iwate-ken 029-3207; Japan
- Coordinates: 38.7969°N 141.1755°E
- Operator: JR East
- Line: ■ Tōhoku Main Line
- Distance: 427.0 km from Tokyo
- Platforms: 2 side platforms
- Tracks: 2

Construction
- Structure type: At grade

Other information
- Status: Unstaffed
- Website: Official website

History
- Opened: 1 July 1954

Services
Preceding station	JR East	Following station
Ishikoshi towards Kuroiso	Tōhoku Main Line Local	Hanaizumi towards Morioka
Location
- Location within Iwate Prefecture Location within Japan

Yushima Station (油島駅, Yushima-eki) is a railway station in the city of Ichinoseki, Japan, operated by East Japan Railway Company (JR East).

== Lines ==
Yushima Station is served by the Tōhoku Main Line, and is located 427.0 rail kilometers from the terminus of the line at Tokyo Station.

== Station layout ==
The station has two opposed side platforms connected to the station building by a footbridge. The platforms are not numbered. The station is unattended.

=== Platforms ===
station side	■ Tōhoku Main Line	for Ichinoseki
opposite side	■ Tōhoku Main Line	for Kogota and Sendai

== History ==
Yushima Station opened on 1 July 1954. The station was absorbed into the JR East network upon the privatization of the Japanese National Railways (JNR) on 1 April 1987. Much of the station platform collapsed during the 2011 Tōhoku earthquake and was rebuilt by March 2012.

== See also ==
- List of railway stations in Japan
