= Daitō, Iwate =

Daitō 大東町
- Former municipality
- Flag Emblem

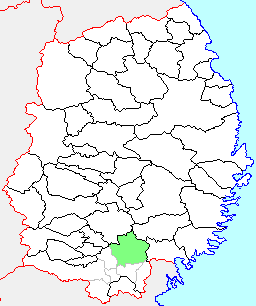
- Location of Daitō in Iwate Prefecture

- Location in Japan
- Coordinates: 39°01′2.9″N 141°23′46.5″E
- Country: Japan
- Region: Tōhoku
- Prefecture: Iwate Prefecture
- District: Higashiiwai
- Merged: September 20, 2005 (now part of Ichinoseki)

Area
  - Total: 278.21 km^{2} (107.42 sq mi)

Population (September 1, 2005)
  - Total: 16,655
  - Density: 59.86/km^{2} (155.0/sq mi)
- Time zone: UTC+09:00 (JST)
- Symbols
- Bird: Japanese bush warbler
- Flower: Azalea
- Tree: Zelkova serrata

Daitō (大東町, Daitō-chō) was a town located in Higashiiwai District, Iwate Prefecture, Japan.

Daitō village was created on April 1, 1889, within Higashiiwai District with the establishment of the municipality system. It was raised to town status on March 21, 1903. On April 1, 1955, it annexed the neighboring towns of Surisawa and Ohara, and the villages of Okita, Sarusawa and Shinutami.

On September 20, 2005, Daitō, along with the towns of Higashiyama and Senmaya, the villages of Kawasaki and Murone (all from Higashiiwai District), and the town of Hanaizumi (from Nishiiwai District), was merged into the expanded city of Ichinoseki and no longer exists as an independent municipality.

As of September 2005, the town had an estimated population of 16,655 and a population density of 59.86 persons per km^{2}. The total area was 278.21 km^{2}.
