= Arikabe Station =

Railway station in Kurihara, Miyagi Prefecture, Japan

Arikabe Station 有壁駅
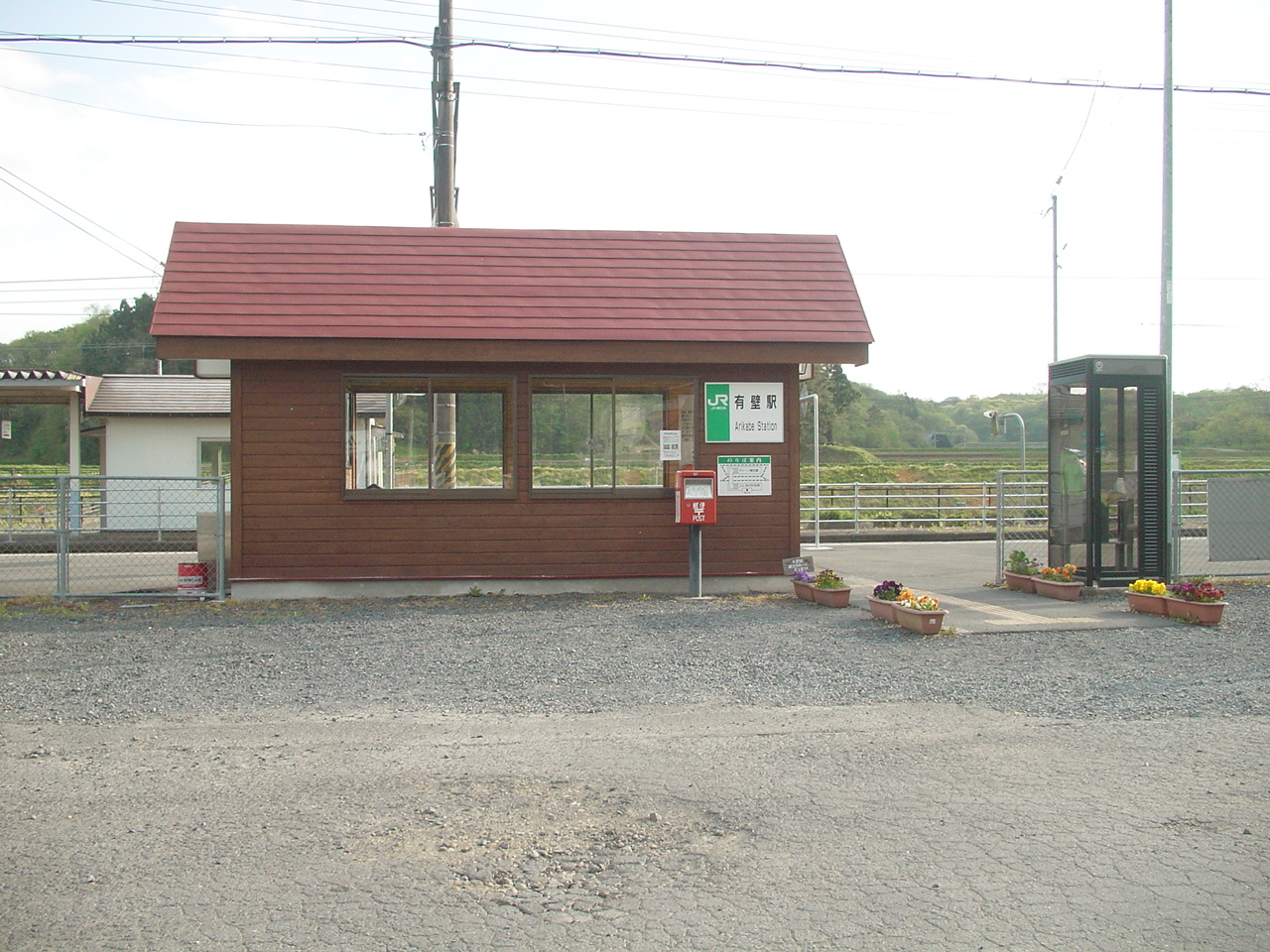
- Arikabe Station, May 2007

General information
- Location: Kannari Arikabe Uehara-mae, Kurihara-shi, Miyagi-ken 989-4806; Japan
- Coordinates: 38.8680°N 141.1211°E
- Operator: JR East
- Line: ■ Tōhoku Main Line
- Distance: 437.8 km from Tokyo
- Platforms: 2 side platforms
- Tracks: 2

Construction
- Structure type: At grade

Other information
- Status: Unstaffed
- Website: Official website

History
- Opened: October 16, 1924

Services
Preceding station	JR East	Following station
Shimizuhara towards Kuroiso	Tōhoku Main Line Local	Ichinoseki towards Morioka
Location
- Location within Miyagi Prefecture Location within Japan

Arikabe Station (有壁駅, Arikabe-eki) is a railway station in the city of Kurihara, Miyagi Prefecture, Japan, operated by East Japan Railway Company (JR East).

== Lines ==
Arikabe Station is served by the Tōhoku Main Line, and is located 437.8 rail kilometers from the terminus of the line at Tokyo Station.

== Station layout ==
Arikabe Station has two opposed side platforms connected to the station building by a footbridge. The station is unattended.

=== Platforms ===
1	■ Tōhoku Main Line	for Kogota and Sendai
2	■ Tōhoku Main Line	for Ichinoseki

== History ==
Arikabe Station opened on October 16, 1924. The station was absorbed into the JR East network upon the privatization of the Japanese National Railways (JNR) on April 1, 1987.

== See also ==
- List of railway stations in Japan
