= Hanaizumi, Iwate =

Hanaizumi 花泉町
- Former municipality
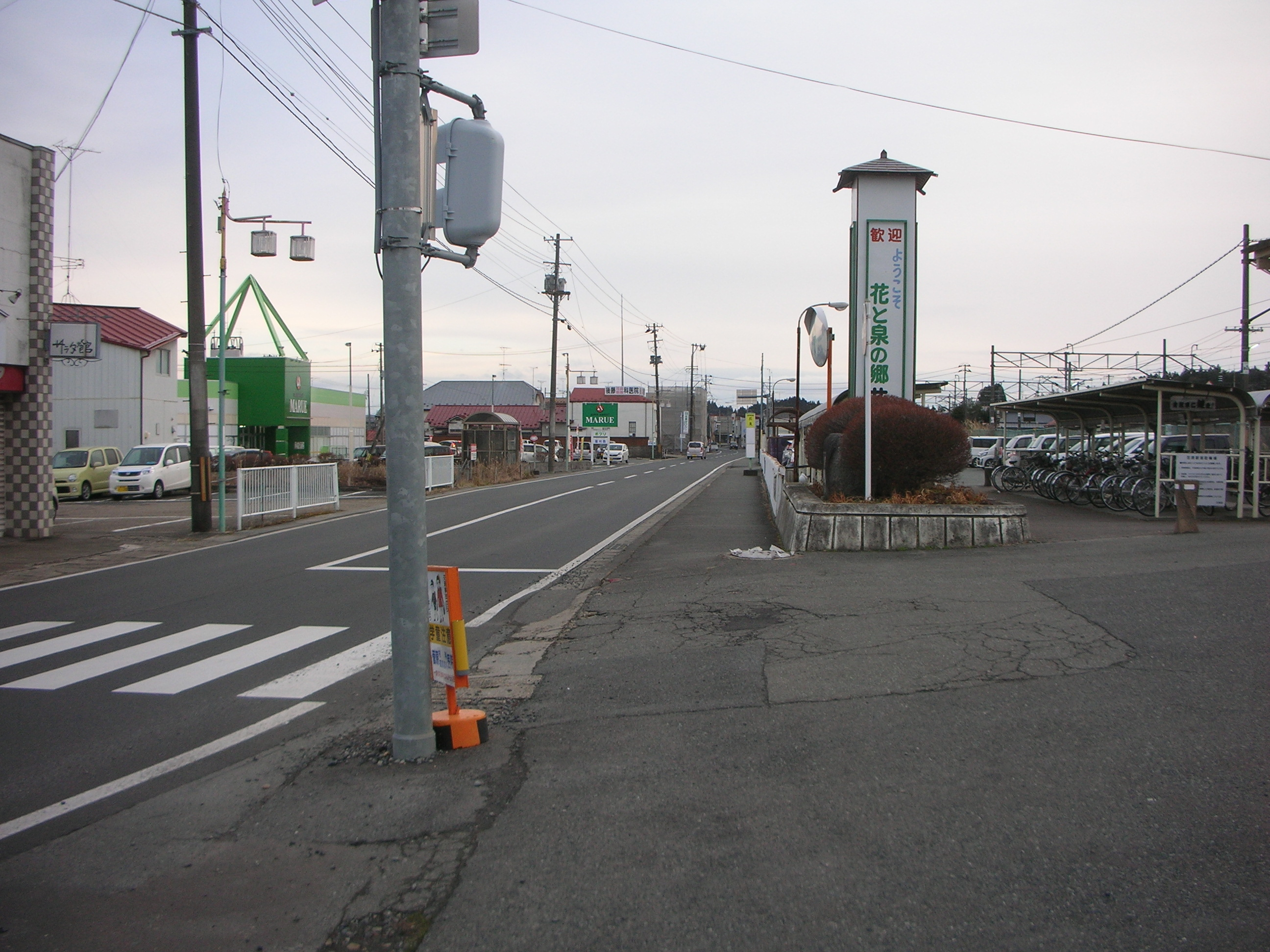

- Flag Emblem

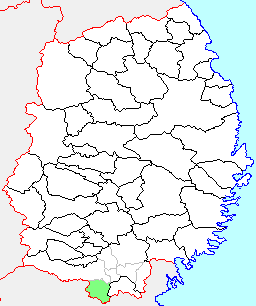
- Location of Hanaizumi in Iwate Prefecture

- Location in Japan
- Coordinates: 38°49′52″N 141°10′59″E
- Country: Japan
- Region: Tōhoku
- Prefecture: Iwate Prefecture
- District: Nishiiwai
- Merged: September 20, 2005 (now part of Ichinoseki)

Area
  - Total: 126.83 km^{2} (48.97 sq mi)

Population (September 1, 2005)
  - Total: 15,367
  - Density: 121.1/km^{2} (314/sq mi)
- Time zone: UTC+09:00 (JST)
- Symbols
- Bird: Green pheasant
- Flower: Sakura
- Tree: Pinus densiflora

Hanaizumi (花泉町, Hanaizumi-machi) was a town located in Nishiiwai District, Iwate Prefecture, Japan.

Hanaizumi village was created on April 1, 1899 with the establishment of the municipalities system. On January 1, 1955, it annexed the neighboring villages of Oimatsu, Nagai, Higata, Yushima and Wakutsu and was raised to town status. On September 20, 2005, Hanaizumi, along with the towns of Daitō, Higashiyama and Senmaya, and the villages of Kawasaki and Murone (all from Higashiiwai District), was merged into the expanded city of Ichinoseki and no longer exists as an independent municipality.

As of September 2005, the town had an estimated population of 15,357 and a population density of 121.1 persons per km^{2}. The total area was 126.83 km^{2}.
