= Niisato, Iwate =

Niisato 新里村
- Former municipality
- Flag Emblem

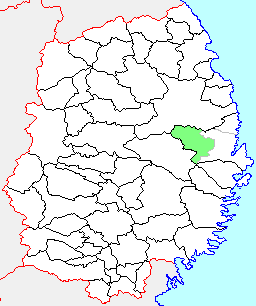
- Location of Niisato in Iwate Prefecture

- Location in Japan
- Coordinates: 39°37′16.42″N 141°08′06″E
- Country: Japan
- Region: Tōhoku
- Prefecture: Iwate Prefecture
- District: Shimohei
- Merged: June 6, 2005 (now part of Miyako)

Area
  - Total: 256.29 km^{2} (98.95 sq mi)

Population (September 1, 2005)
  - Total: 3,535
  - Density: 13.8/km^{2} (36/sq mi)
- Time zone: UTC+09:00 (JST)
- Symbols
- Bird: Japanese bush warbler
- Flower: Far East Amur adonis
- Tree: Paulownia tomentosa

Niisato (新里村, Niisato-mura) was a village located in Shimohei District, Iwate Prefecture, Japan.

The villages of Moichi, and Kariya were created on April 1, 1889 within Shimohei District with the establishment of the municipality system. The two villages merged on February 1, 1955 to create the village of Niisato. On June 6, 2005, Niisato, along with the town of Tarō (also from Shimohei District), was merged into the expanded city of Miyako and no longer exists as an independent municipality. As of June 2005, the village had an estimated population of 3,535 and a population density of 13.8 persons per km^{2}. The total area was 256.29 km^{2}.

The population of the former village is centered on the intersection of the Shimohei and Kariya Rivers. Niisato lies along National Highway 106 between Morioka and Miyako. There is also a small winding road from Niisato north to Iwaizumi town. The major distinguishing travel landmarks the bus stops along Highway 106, which are shaped like giant red apples. The village had a sister city relationship with La Trinidad in the Philippines.
