= Higashiyama, Iwate =

Higashiyama 東山町
- Former municipality
- Flag Emblem

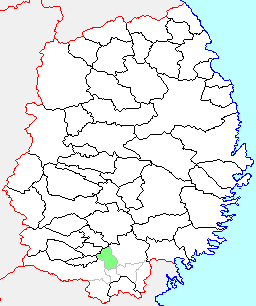
- Location of Higashiyama in Iwate Prefecture

- Location in Japan
- Coordinates: 38°59′47″N 141°15′13″E
- Country: Japan
- Region: Tōhoku
- Prefecture: Iwate Prefecture
- District: Higashiiwai
- Merged: September 20, 2005 (now part of Ichinoseki)

Area
  - Total: 87.72 km^{2} (33.87 sq mi)

Population (September 1, 2005)
  - Total: 8,027
  - Density: 91.51/km^{2} (237.0/sq mi)
- Time zone: UTC+09:00 (JST)
- Symbols
- Bird: Copper pheasant
- Flower: Lilium auratum
- Tree: Pinus densiflora

Higashiyama (東山町, Higashiyama-chō) was a town located in Higashiiwai District, Iwate Prefecture, Japan.

Higashiyama village was created on February 1, 1955 by the merger of the villages of Takozu and Nagasaka. On November 1, 1958 it merged with the village of Matsukawa to become Higashiyama Town. On September 20, 2005, Higashiyama, along with the towns of Daitō and Senmaya, the villages of Kawasaki and Murone (all from Higashiiwai District), and the town of Hanaizumi (from Nishiiwai District), was merged into the expanded city of Ichinoseki and no longer exists as an independent municipality.

As of September 2005, the town had an estimated population of 8,027 and a population density of 91.51 persons per km^{2}. The total area was 87.72 km^{2}.
