= Fujisawa, Iwate =

Fujisawa 藤沢町
- Former municipality
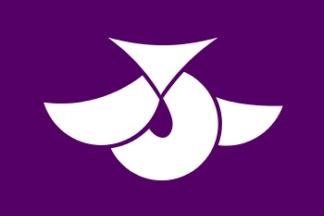
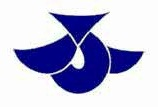
- Flag Emblem

- Location of Fujisawa in Iwate Prefecture

- Location in Japan
- Coordinates: 38.867°N 141.350°E
- Country: Japan
- Region: Tōhoku
- Prefecture: Iwate Prefecture
- District: Higashiiwai
- Merged: September 26, 2011 (now part of Ichinoseki)

Area
  - Total: 123.15 km^{2} (47.55 sq mi)

Population (September 1, 2011)
  - Total: 8,950
  - Density: 72.76/km^{2} (188.4/sq mi)
- Time zone: UTC+09:00 (JST)
- Symbols
- Bird: Oriental turtle dove
- Flower: Wisteria floribunda
- Tree: Cryptomeria

Fujisawa (藤沢町, Fujisawa-chō) was a town located in Higashiiwai District, Iwate Prefecture, Japan that is now part of the city of Ichinoseki, Iwate. As of June 2005, the town had an estimated population of 8,950 and a population density of 72.76 persons per km^{2}. The total area was 123.15 km^{2}.

The Fujisawa village was created on April 1, 1889 within Higashiiwai District with the establishment of the municipality system. It was raised to town status on June 1, 1926. On August 20, 1954, it annexed the neighboring villages of Kinomi, Yasawa and a portion of Otsubo village.

On September 26, 2011, Fujisawa was merged into the expanded city of Ichinoseki municipality, Higashiiwai District.

It had connections to Blackwater and Emerald in the Central Highlands in Queensland, a coal and farming region in Australia. Fujisawa holds an annual festival each Autumn entitled the Noyaki Matsuri. During this time, students from all schools in the town create a pottery design to be fired in open pits as part of a community competition. The festival welcomes potters and sculptors from around Japan and internationally to Fujisawa. Food stalls, taiko drumming, and ceremonial dancing are also featured on the sports fields of Junior High Schools. It is a town of International Friendship for over 30 years with Australia and Vietnam.

Several businesses are in the Fujisawa environs, such as the Shoei Motorcycle Helmut Factory. There is an annual motocross racing event located 30 minutes from the eastern coast of Japan.
