= Yonezawa (disambiguation) =

Yonezawa is a city in Yamagata Prefecture, Japan.

Yonezawa may also refer to:

- Yonezawa (surname)
- Yonezawa Toys, a Japanese toy company
- Yonezawa Domain, a former domain in Dewa Province, Japan
- Yonezawa Shokai Building, a building in Iwate Prefecture, Japan

== See also ==
- Yonezawa beef
