= List of cities in Iwate Prefecture by population =

The following list sorts all cities (including towns and villages) in the Japanese prefecture of Iwate with a population of more than 5,000 according to the 2020 Census. As of October 1, 2020, 30 places fulfill this criterion and are listed here. This list refers only to the population of individual cities, towns and villages within their defined limits, which does not include other municipalities or suburban areas within urban agglomerations.

== List ==
The following table lists the 30 cities, villages and towns in Iwate with a population of at least 5,000 on October 1, 2020, according to the 2020 Census. The table also gives an overview of the evolution of the population since the 1995 census.

Rank (2020)	Name	Status	2020	2015	2010	2005	2000	1995
1	Morioka	City	289,893	297,631	298,348	300,746	302,857	300,723
2	Ōshū	City	113,027	119,422	124,746	130,171	133,056	133,228
3	Ichinoseki	City	111,970	121,583	127,642	135,722	140,825	143,974
4	Hanamaki	City	93,234	97,702	101,438	105,028	107,175	107,112
5	Kitakami	City	93,089	93,511	93,138	94,321	91,501	87,969
6	Takizawa	City	55,600	55,463	53,857	53,560	51,241	44,189
7	Miyako	City	50,401	56,676	59,430	63,588	66,986	69,587
8	Ōfunato	City	34,739	38,058	40,737	43,331	45,160	46,277
9	Kuji	City	33,063	35,642	36,872	39,141	40,178	41,225
10	Shiwa	Town	32,166	32,614	33,288	33,692	33,038	31,311
11	Kamaishi	City	32,096	36,802	39,574	42,987	46,521	49,447
12	Yahaba	Town	28,076	27,678	27,205	27,085	25,268	21,919
13	Ninohe	City	25,528	27,611	29,702	31,477	33,102	33,755
14	Tōno	City	25,381	28,062	29,331	31,402	33,108	33,898
15	Hachimantai	City	24,042	26,355	28,680	31,079	32,485	32,751
16	Rikuzentakata	City	18,271	19,758	23,300	24,709	25,676	26,129
17	Shizukuishi	Town	15,742	16,981	18,033	19,055	19,750	19,373
18	Kanegasaki	Town	15,545	15,895	16,325	16,396	16,383	15,923
19	Hirono	Town	15,098	16,693	17,913	19,524	20,465	21,322
20	Yamada	Town	14,332	15,826	18,617	20,142	21,214	22,019
21	Iwate	Town	12,294	13,692	14,984	16,254	17,372	18,264
22	Ichinohe	Town	11,506	12,919	14,187	15,549	16,933	17,906
23	Ōtsuchi	Town	11,013	11,759	15,276	16,516	17,480	18,301
24	Iwaizumi	Town	8,732	9,841	10,804	11,914	12,845	13,879
25	Karumai	Town	8,423	9,333	10,209	10,997	11,863	12,290
26	Hiraizumi	Town	7,258	7,868	8,345	8,819	9,054	9,288
27	Kuzumaki	Town	5,638	6,344	7,304	8,021	8,725	9,536
28	Kunohe	Village	5,376	5,865	6,507	6,974	7,324	7,727
29	Nishiwaga	Town	5,137	5,880	6,602	7,375	7,983	8,594
30	Sumita	Town	5,050	5,720	6,190	6,848	7,305	7,783
