= Tsunami stone =

Japanese stones that warn of tsunamis

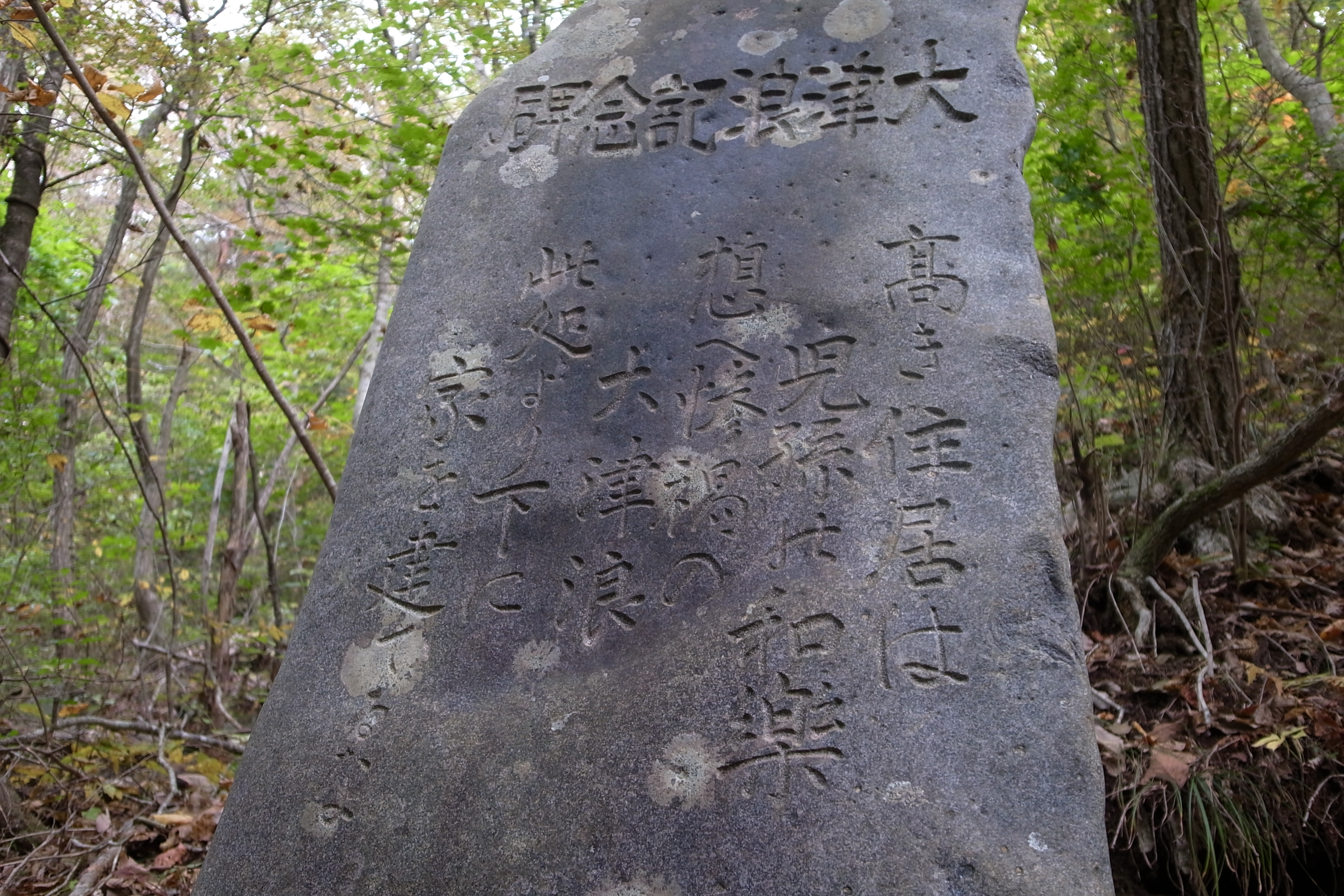
A tsunami stone erected to commemorate the 1933 Sanriku earthquake and tsunami at Aneyoshi Village, Miyako, Iwate

The symbol used on Japanese maps for natural disaster monuments, including tsunamis, landslides and volcanic eruptions

A tsunami stone is a type of stone monument found in Japan that warns people to move upwards after a large earthquake to avoid a potential tsunami. Some simply provide this warning, while others list death tolls, are placed near mass graves or say where homes should be built. They have flat faces and some are up to 3.0 metres (10 ft) in height. Some are over 600 years old, and due to ageing, some have had the characters written onto them disappear. Most were placed in about 1896 after an earthquake and two tsunamis that year caused about 22,000 deaths. The tsunami stone in Aneyoshi says: "High dwellings are the peace and harmony of our descendants. ... Remember the calamity of the great tsunamis. Do not build any homes below this point."

The stones help remind people, as according to Tohoku University professor Fumihiko Imamura, "It takes about three generations for people to forget. Those that experience the disaster themselves pass it to their children and their grandchildren, but then the memory fades." As some coastal towns have modernised and have built seawalls, some citizens have started ignoring the stones as they have started believing that the sea walls will protect them.

The stones are viewed as outdated by many Japanese people. After the 2011 Tōhoku earthquake and tsunami, it was suggested that some tsunami-ruined buildings be preserved to serve as warnings. This is similar to the Hiroshima Peace Memorial which was preserved after the bombing of Hiroshima in 1945.

== See also ==
- Natural disasters in Japan
- Tsunami Warning (Japan)
- Yonezawa Shokai Building - a preserved building that marks the location and height of the 2011 tsunami
- Hunger stone
