= Takekoma Station =

Former railway station in Rikuzentakata, Iwate Prefecture, Japan

Takekoma Station 竹駒駅
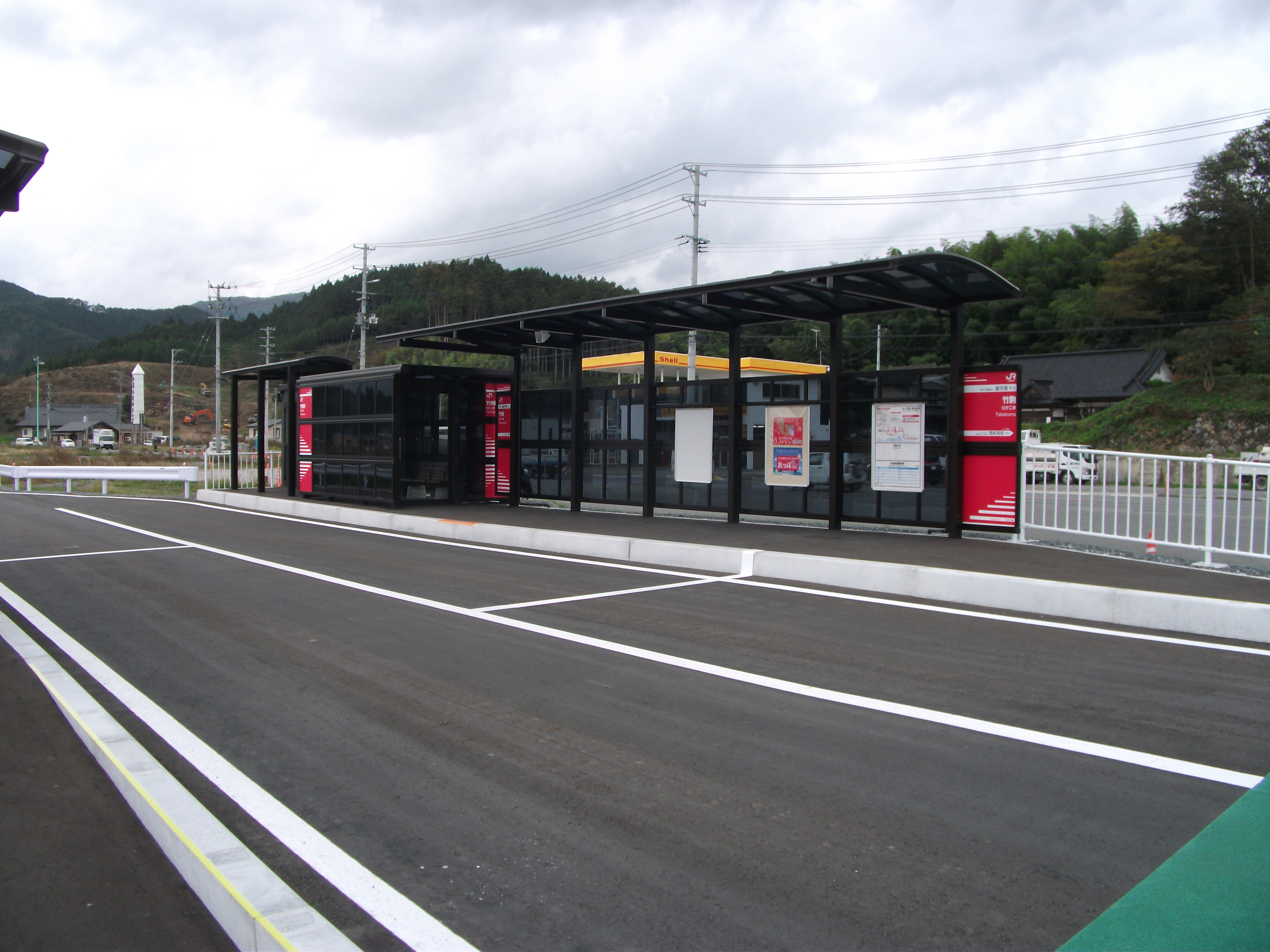
- Takekoma Station in October 2013

General information
- Location: Takekoma-cho, Rikuzentakata-shi, Iwate-ken; Japan
- Coordinates: 39°02′01″N 141°36′35″E
- Operator: JR East
- Line: ■ Ōfunato Line
- Distance: 82.5 km from Ichinoseki
- Platforms: 1 side platform

Construction
- Structure type: At grade

Other information
- Status: Staffed
- Website: Official website

History
- Opened: 15 December 1933
- Closed: 11 March 2011

Services
Preceding station	JR East	Following station
Rikuzen-Yahagi Terminus	Kesennuma / Ōfunato BRT branch service	Tochigasawa-Kouen towards Sakari

Former services
Preceding station	JR East	Following station
Rikuzen-Yahagi towards Ichinoseki	Ōfunato Line	Rikuzen-Takata towards Sakari
Location
- Location within Japan

Takekoma Station (竹駒駅, Takekoma-eki) was a JR East railway station located in Rikuzentakata, Iwate Prefecture, Japan. The station was destroyed by the 2011 Tōhoku earthquake and tsunami and has now been replaced by a provisional bus rapid transit line.

== Lines ==
Takekoma Station was served by the Ōfunato Line, and was located 82.5 rail kilometers from the terminus of the line at Ichinoseki Station.

== Station layout ==
Takekoma Station had a single side platform serving one bi-directional track. The station was unattended.

== History ==
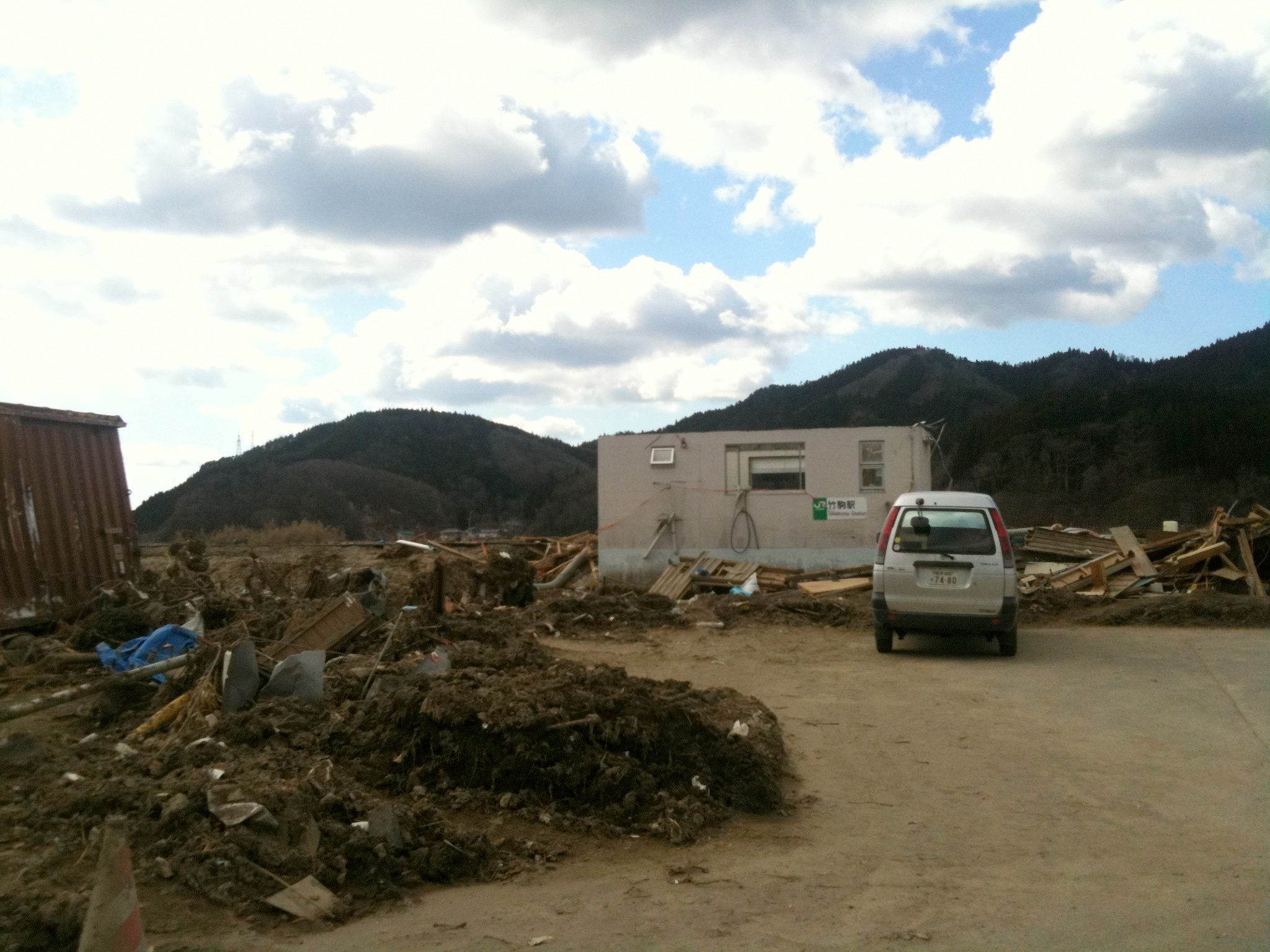
Takekoma Station after the 2011 Tōhoku earthquake and tsunami

Takekoma Station opened on 14 December 1933. The station was absorbed into the JR East network upon the privatization of the Japan National Railways (JNR) on April 1, 1987. The station was one of six stations on the Ōfunato Line destroyed by the 11 March 2011 Tōhoku earthquake and tsunami. Services have now been replaced by a BRT.

== Surrounding area ==
- National Route 340
- National Route 343
- Takekoma Jinja

== See also ==
- List of railway stations in Japan
