= Takata-matsubara =

Takata Matsubara
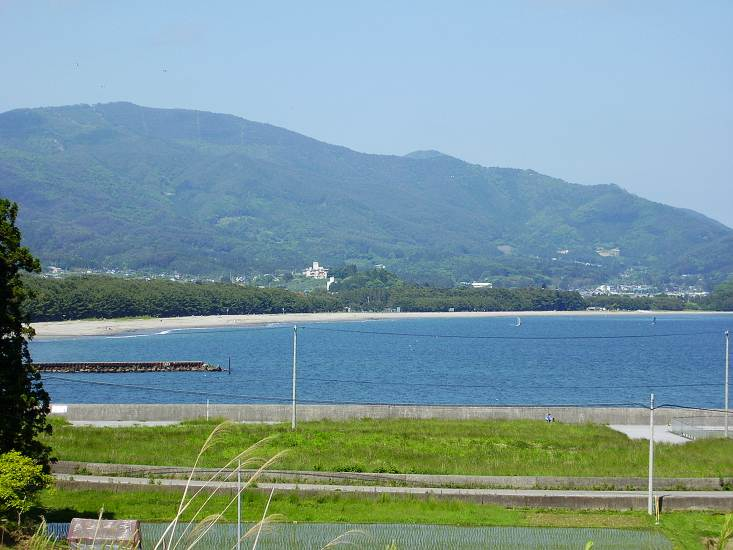
- Takata-matsubara before 2011 Tohoku earthquake

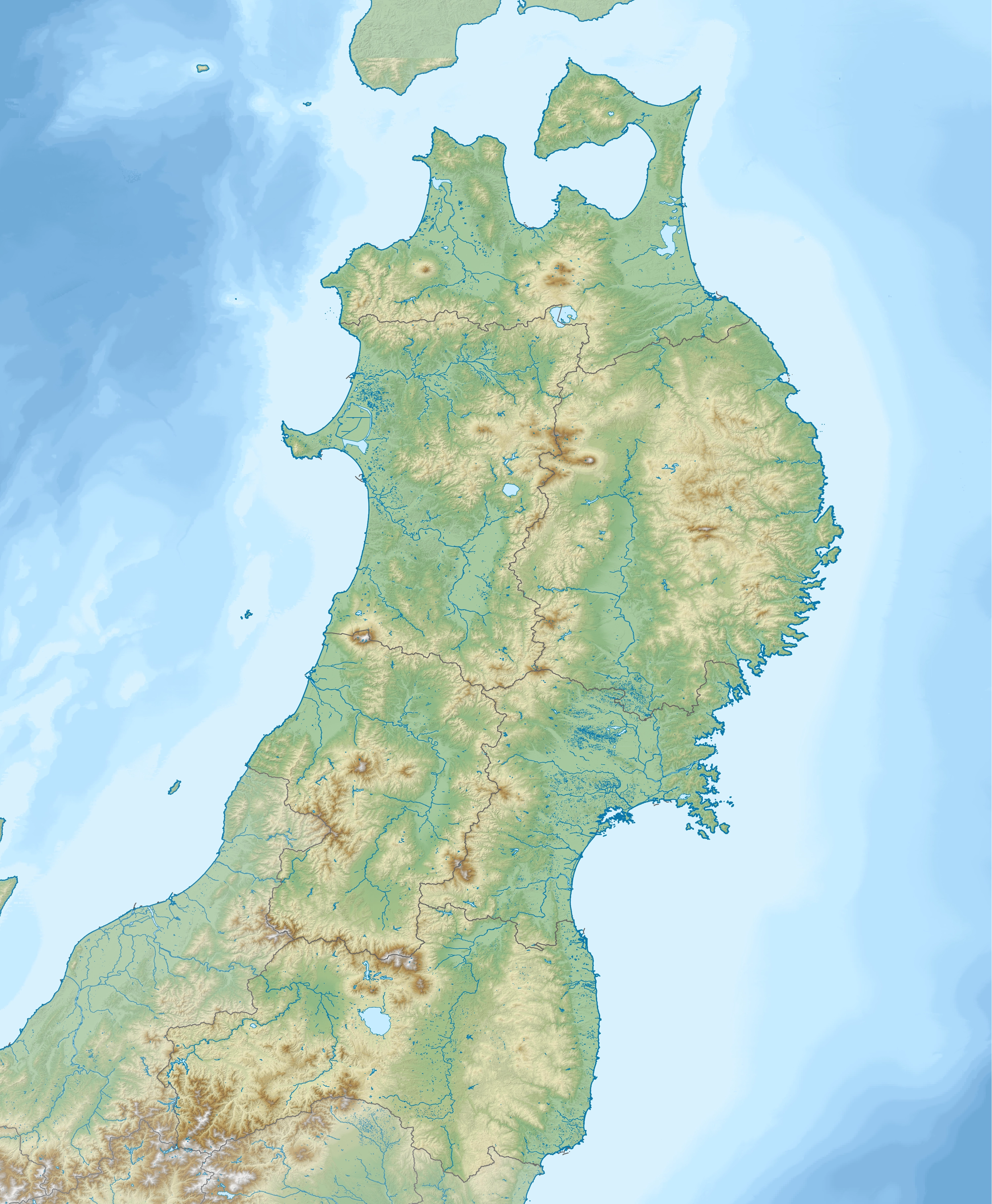
- Location within Iwate Prefecture Location within Tohoku, Japan
- Location: Rikuzentakata, Iwate, Japan
- Coordinates: 39.0034°N 141.6251°E
- Length: 2 km (1.2 mi)
- Designated: 1940
- National Palace of Scenic Beauty

Takata Matsubara (高田松原) or Takata Pine Forest was a pine grove located on the Pacific seashore of the city of Rikuzentakata, Iwate Prefecture, Japan. It was designated a nationally designated Place of Scenic Beauty in 1940 and one of the 100 Landscapes of Japan during the Shōwa era. After the grove was destroyed during the 2011 Tōhoku earthquake and tsunami, tree planting efforts commenced in 2017 and 2018.

== History and overview ==
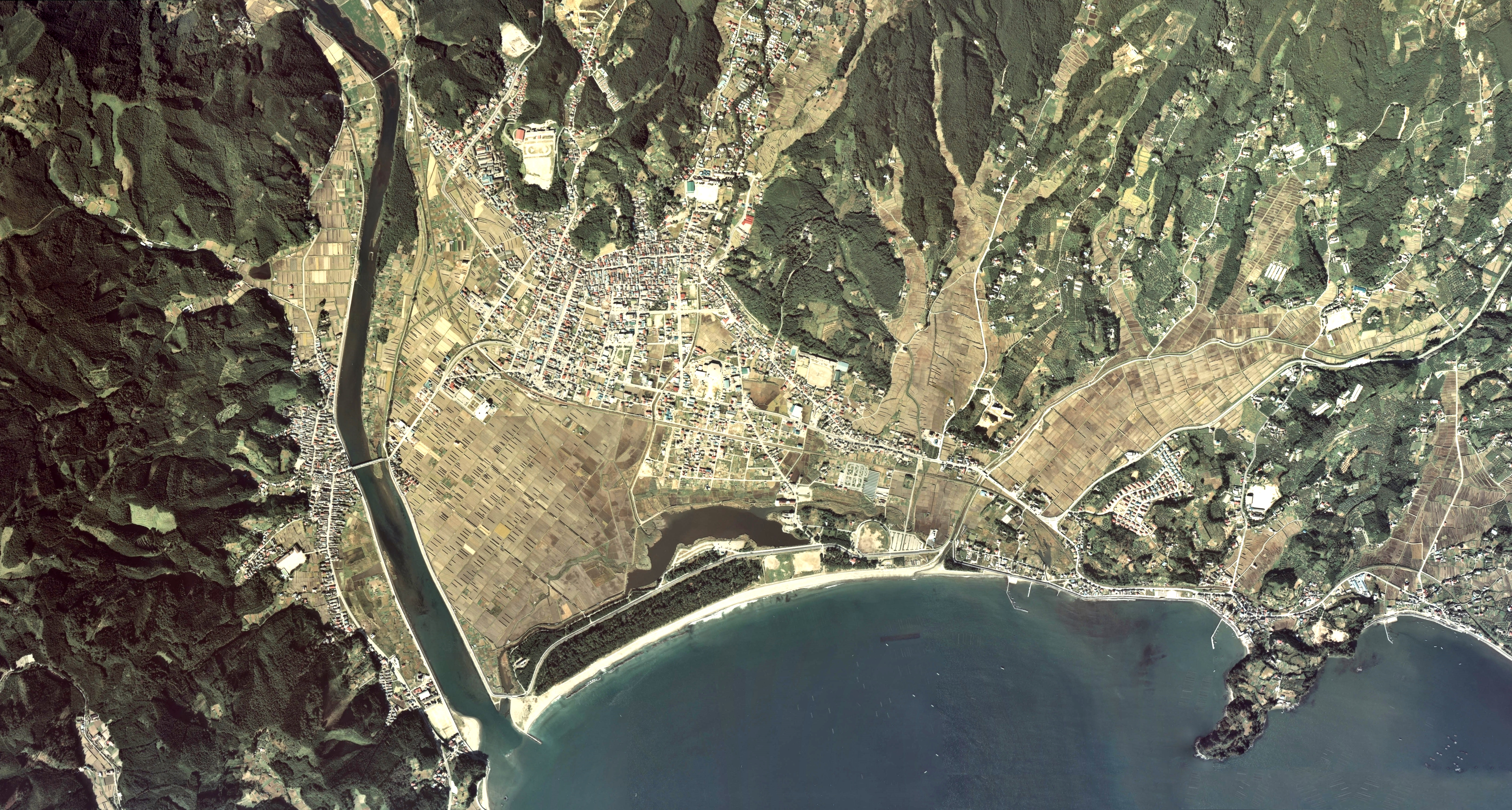
Rikuzentakata city center with Takata Matsubara in 1977

The Takata Matsubara was planted by local merchant-magnate Kanno Mokunosuke in 1667, under the instruction of Date Tsunamune, the daimyō of Sendai Domain, and initially consisted of 6200 Japanese red pine trees, and was intended to form a living sea wall to protect the port village from high winds, high tides and tsunami. The pine grove was expanded in the Kyōhō period (1716–1736) by his son Shichizaemon and grandson Hachisaburo with an additional 70,000 trees, which were a mixture of Japanese red pine and Japanese black pine along a two kilometer stretch of beach.

The area was extolled for its scenic beauty and it became part of the Rikuchū Kaigan National Park in 1964, drawing many thousands of visitors annually.

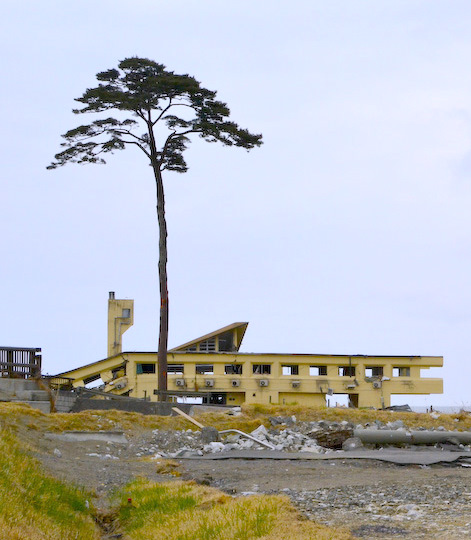
Miracle Pine Tree

The Takata Matsubara served its purpose on several occasions, protecting the settlement from tsunami caused by the 1896 Sanriku earthquake, 1933 Sanriku earthquake and the 1960 Valdivia earthquake. However, in the 2011 Tōhoku earthquake and tsunami, the tsunami was over 10 meters in height at this location, and almost the entire grove was completely swept away, with the exception of one lone pine tree.

This lone survivor caught the public's imagination as a symbol of hope and was widely reported upon by newspapers worldwide. Also, since one tree survived, the official designation as a "Place of Scenic Beauty" was not revoked. The lone surviving pine died in December 2012 due to seawater contamination of the surrounding soil. Disaster recovery work began in December 2013 with the building of a new sea wall and restoration of the beach, which had been buried in meters of silt. Cleanup efforts were hampered by fears that the wood of the fallen pines had been contaminated by radiation. Tree planting events were held in 2017 and 2018, during which time 2500 pine seedlings were planted by volunteers. The area is now part of the Sanriku Fukkō National Park.

== See also ==
- List of Places of Scenic Beauty of Japan (Iwate)
- Miracle Pine Tree
- Miho no Matsubara
