= Lake Furukawanuma =

Coordinates: 39°0′30.1″N 141°38′3.7″E

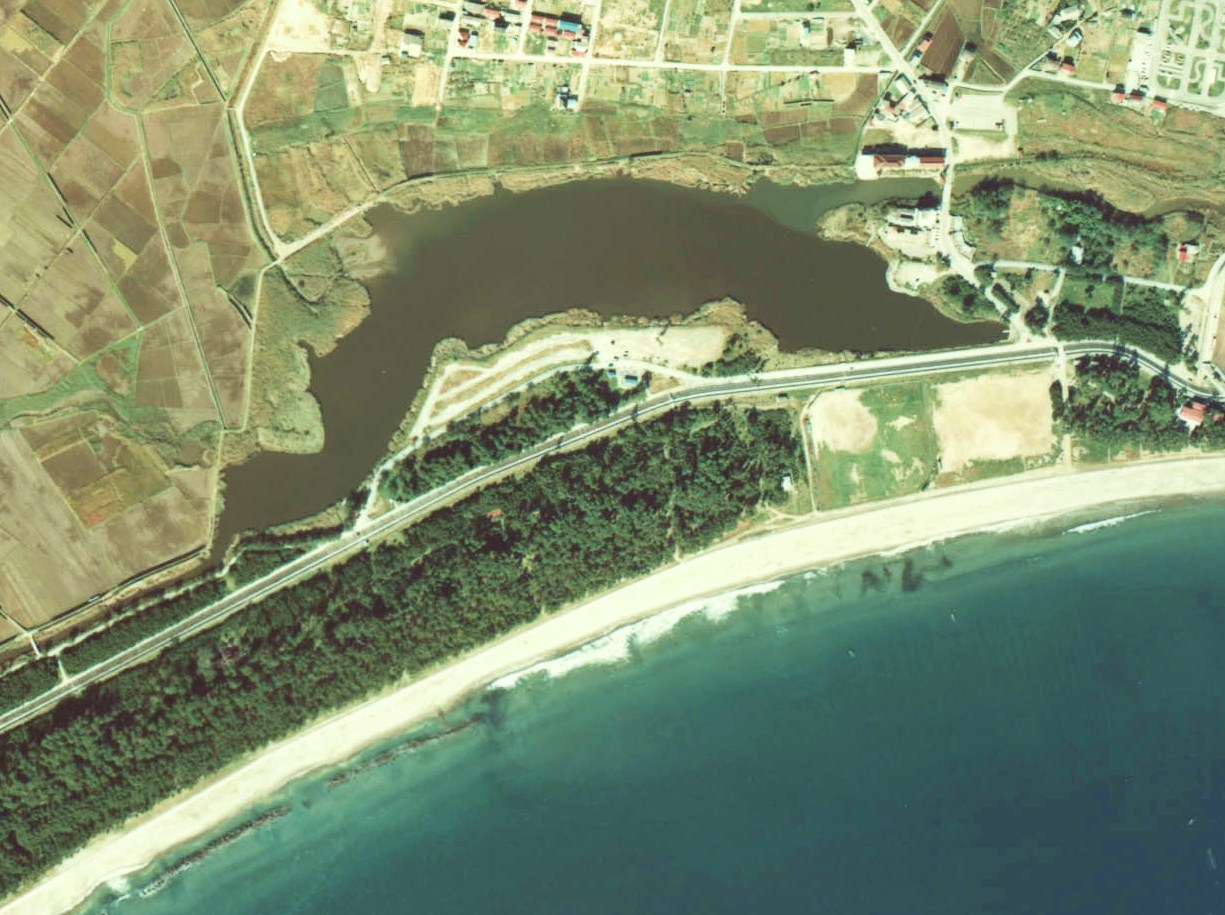
- Interactive map of Lake Furukawanuma
- Location: Rikuzentakata, Iwate, Japan
- Type: Former lake
- Primary inflows: Kawara River, Koizumi River, Kesen River, sea water
- Primary outflows: Became part of the sea
- Basin countries: Japan

Lake Furukawanuma (古川沼, Furukawanuma) was a lake that existed in Rikuzentakata, Iwate, Japan until March 11, 2011, the day of the 2011 Tohoku earthquake. The sand wall between the lake and sea was destroyed by the subsequent tsunami, making the lake part of the sea.

== History ==
Rikuzentakada is the largest alluvial plain along the ria of the Sanriku Coast. The plain started to form at the last stage of the ice age when the sea level rose. Sand was carried from the Kesen River into Hirota Bay. About 7500 years ago, the surface area of the bay grew, thus the present plain was under water. Mud deposited in the Furukawanuma Lake was formed by the formation of sand hills about 1,000 years ago. There was a 200 to 300 metres (660 to 980 ft) wide deposition of sand blocking part of the Hirota Bay. Mud was deposited in Hirota Bay which became deeper. Pine trees were planted along the seashore in the Edo period. The Sanriku Coast has many ria coasts which have frequently been shaped by the actions of tsunami. In 1835, during the Tenpo era, a tsunami destroyed the pine trees, but the trees acted as a barrier and the city of Rikuzen Takata was saved from the full impact of the tsunami.

The Kawara River flowed into the lake from the north-west, while the Koizumi River flowed from the east. The rivers contained particulates that fell to the lake bed beneath. The Kesen River flowed into the lake when there were floods, and the incoming fresh water mixed with sea water. A lock was installed to facilitate the transport of boats to and from the ocean, but it did not block all the water from the sea.

The damage of the city by the tsunamis of 1896 and 1933 was comparatively small because of the pine trees which served as a tide-water control forest. The Chile tsunami (or 1960 Valdivia earthquake) mauled the city of Sanriku Takada. The tsunami came over the sand hills and the 3 metres (9.8 ft) high dike, built in 1908, and over the dike of the northern part of the lake into the Kawara River. Low areas of the city were flooded. A 140 metres (460 ft) segment of the dike was destroyed, which formed a water lane for over 200 metres (660 ft) connecting the lake and the sea. Through the efforts of 1,500 soldiers of the Imperial Japanese Army, a dike was made between the lake and the sea.

The first dike was constructed between 1960 and 1963 for the protection of the pine trees. The second dike, 5.5 metres (18 ft) high, was constructed between 1963 and 1966 to protect the city from tsunamis. In 1968, a gate was attached to the water lane of Kesen River to prevent water flowing into the lake at high tide. By the installment of the watergate, the water of the lake became closed and the lake was polluted by the city's waste water. The pollution progressed with the deposition of sludge. Previously swimming was possible, but with increasing pollution, the lake produced an offensive odor. A red tide occurred.

In the 1970s, the quality of water was comparatively high. After the 1960 Valdivia earthquake (the 1960 Chile tsunami), an iron floodgate was installed, and the quality of water in the lake diminished by the flow of waste into the lake. Attempts to purify the water continued. The tsunami in 2011 removed all the sandbanks forming the lake and the lake disappeared.

=== Purification ===
In 1982, volunteers from Rikuzen Takada started a campaign to clean up the lake. The sludge was 2 metres (6 ft 7 in) thick while the lake was 4 to 5 metres (13 to 16 ft) deep. In 1984, they started to clean the lake. In 1985, the use of phosphate in detergents was prohibited. Clean water regulations were established for the lake in 1987. Experts experimented with ways to remove the sludge efficiently with minimum disturbance to water quality. In March 1992, Iwate Prefecture started to clean the lake.

In December 1998, the Kawaharagawa Gate was opened and the water of the lake was mixed with seawater. Sewage from Rikuzen Takada city had been discharged into nearby waterways which fed into the lake, but in 1998, the city constructed a new system for treatment of sewage. Removal of the sludge in the lake was completed in 2001. Volunteers distributed water cut bags to be used in kitchens. The level of purification reached the standard level (Lake B type). Water fowl returned to the lake.

=== Tsunami research ===
Between 2006 and 2008, investigations were made to reveal the traces of previous tsunami deposits. Traces were found for the tsunamis of 1611, 1933, and 1896, but not of 869. It was concluded that the tsunami of 869 did not arrive at the lake.

=== Disappearance ===
On March 11, 2011, the waves of the tsunami, more than 10 metres (33 ft) high, destroyed two dikes and the sand hills and the lake diminished into the sea.
