= Hunger stone =

Type of landmark

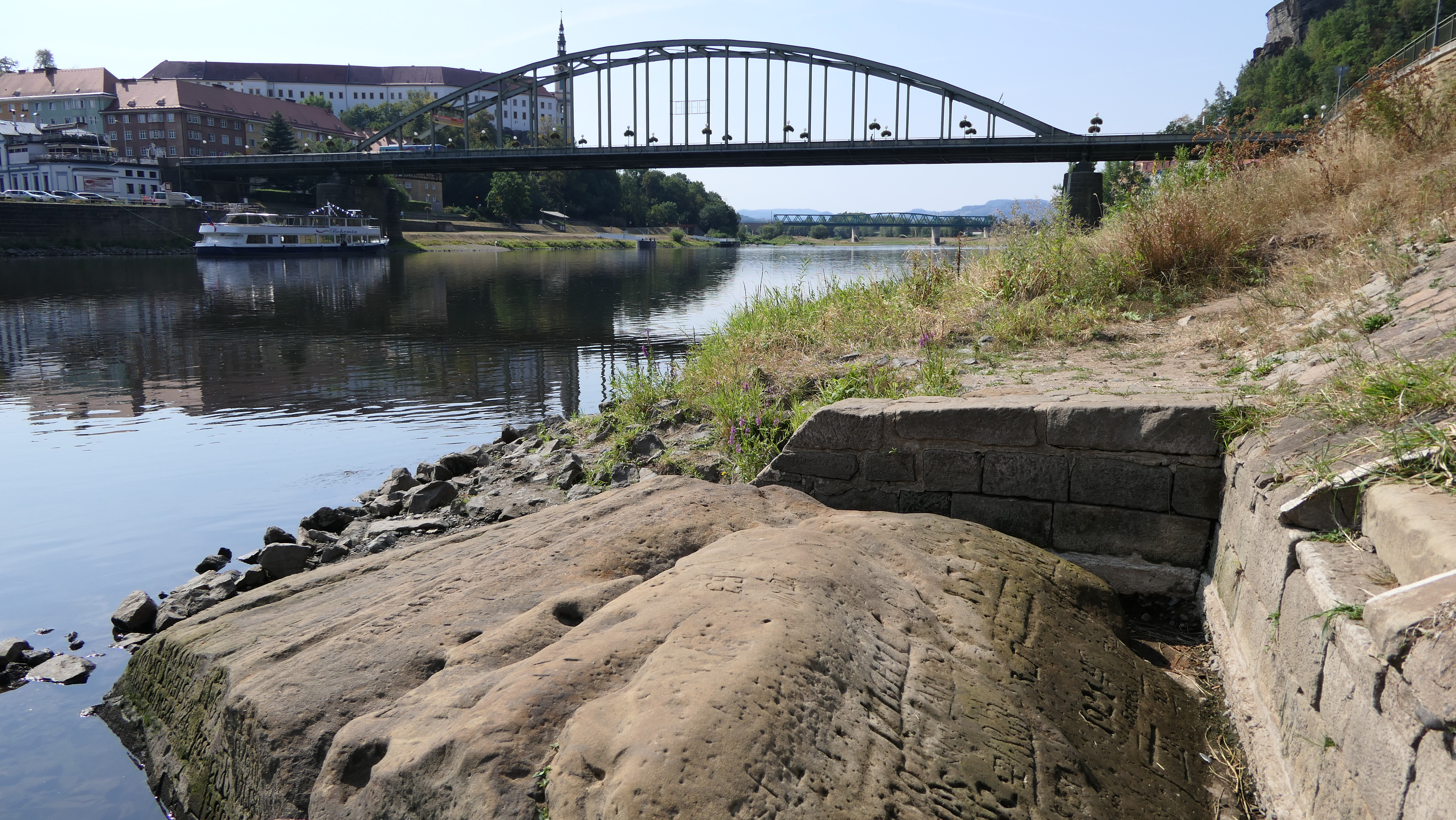
A hunger stone at the Elbe river in Děčín, Czech Republic

A hunger stone (German: Hungerstein) is a type of hydrological landmark common in Central Europe. Hunger stones serve as famine memorials and warnings and were erected in Germany and in ethnic German settlements throughout Europe in the 15th through 19th centuries.

These stones were carved during droughts to mark the water level as a warning to future generations that they will have to endure famine-related hardships if the water sinks to this level again. One famous example in the Elbe river in Děčín, Czech Republic, has "Wenn du mich siehst, dann weine" ("If you see me, then weep") carved into it as a warning.

In 1918, a hunger stone on the bed of the Elbe River, near Děčín, became exposed during a period of low water coincident with the wartime famines of World War I. Similar hunger stones in the river were uncovered again during droughts in 2018, 2022, and in 2026.

== Known hunger stones ==
| River | Country | Location | Notes | Picture |
|---|---|---|---|---|
| Danube | Hungary | Budapest, right (Buda) riverside at the foot of the Gellért Hill, very close to Szabadság híd 47.485358°N 19.052978°E | A small stone, Ínség-szikla/kő (English: Famine/Hunger cliff/stone) in the Danube, which is visible at water levels below 95 cm. The stone is located 95.75 metres above sea level. This is the last such remaining stone in the vicinity, the other ones were demolished when the river bank path was built between 1898 and 1899 | Ínség-szikla |
| Drava | Slovenia | Maribor Island near Kamnica 46.567222°N 15.611667°E | Inscribed with the date 1834. Stone reappeared in the drought of 1921, and it was proposed that that date would be added to the stone as well. | |
| Elbe | Czech Republic | Děčín (Tetschen) left riverbank, near the Tyrs bridge 50.7825749°N 14.2078325°E | The stone measures approximately 6 m³ and is carved with different years of drought. The oldest readable carving is from 1616, with older carvings (1417 and 1473) having been wiped out by anchoring ships during the years. The stone also features the Czech sentence „Neplač holka, nenaříkej, když je sucho, pole stříkej“ (lit. "Girl, don't weep and moan, if it's dry, water the field"), probably added in 1938. This hunger stone is one of the oldest hydrological landmarks in the Elbe river. | Hungerstein in Děčín |
| Elbe | Czech Republic | Těchlovice nad Labem near Děčín | Stone with the number 1666 (Roman: MDCLXVI) | |
| Elbe | Czech Republic | Těchlovice near Děčín 50.705692°N 14.197161°E | Stone with multiple years: 1892, 1903, 1904, 1911, 1928, 1963, 2015 etc. | Hungerstein in Techlovice |
| Elbe | Czech Republic | Dolní Žleb, part of Děčín 50.849096°N 14.216029°E | Approximately ten stones with the years 1842, 1868, 1892, 1904, 2015 | Hungerstein in Niedergrund |
| Elbe | Germany | Schmilka, near the border crossing | | |
| Elbe | Germany | Prossen, beneath former train conductor's house | Five years between 1928 and 2015 are carved on a skewed stone plate | |
| Elbe | Germany | Königstein, near the village | Year 1681 | |
| Elbe | Germany | Königstein, left riverbank near the Biela river 50.919913°N 14.072226°E | Years 1952, 2003, 2015 | Hungerstein in Königstein |
| Elbe | Germany | Stadt Wehlen, district of Pötzscha 50.949355°N 14.017302°E | Year 1868 | Wehlener Hungerstein im Ortsteil Pötzscha |
| Elbe | Germany | Pirna, district Oberposta, right riverbank | According to the city archives, a stone with the year 1115 existed but its location is no longer known. Near Oberposta there is a stone with more than fifteen years between 1707 and 2015 carved into it | Hungerstein in Pirna |
| Elbe | Germany | Dresden-Pillnitz, near the stairs of Pillnitz Castle's western sphinx 51.008237°N 13.869039°E | Years: 1778, 1893, 1904, 2003, 2018. | Hungerstein in Pillnitz |
| Elbe | Germany | Dresden-Laubegast 51.023416°N 13.841373°E | Years: 1893, 1899, 2003, 2015. | Hungersteine in Laubegast |
| Elbe | Germany | Dresden-Tolkewitz, near Tolkewitzer Street 73 51.041975°N 13.817859°E | Year: 2016. | Tolkewitzer Hungerstein |
| Elbe | Germany | Dresden-Blasewitz | 2 by 2 meter stone near kilometer 48.7 with years: 1930, 1943, 1947, 1950, 1963 etc. | |
| Elbe | Germany | Radebeul-Kötzschenbroda, near the steam ship port 51.103230°N 13.622900°E | Year 1811 | Radebeuler Hungerstein |
| Elbe | Germany | Meißen | Was recorded by Johann Friedrich Usinus to have been spotted in 1746 bearing the carving of the year 1654 | |
| Elbe | Germany | Torgau, on the right side near the destroyed bridge | Can be seen at a water level of 50 cm or lower | Hungersteine in Torgau |
| Elbe | Germany | Schönebeck (Elbe), near kilometer 311 on the right riverbank | Measuring 1.5 by 1.5 by 2 meters and weighing 10 tons | Hungerstein in Schönebeck |
| Elbe | Germany | Schönebeck (Elbe), museum of the city (formerly in the port) | 47 cm in size, year: 1904 | Hungerstein im Kreismuseum Schönebeck |
| Elbe | Germany | Westerhüsen, part of Magdeburg 52.056913°N 11.686170°E | see Hungerstones near Westerhülsen | Hungersteine bei Westerhüsen |
| Elbe | Germany | Magdeburg, Domfelsen 52.12265°N 11.63668°E | Red sandstone formation near Domfelsen, also called Hungerfelsen (lit. "hunger rock"); carved 2018 in August | Domfelsen Magdeburg |
| Elbe | Germany | Bleckede, near the ferry port | Kilometer 550. Carved with the sentence: Geht dieser Stein unter, wird das Leben wieder bunter (lit. When this stone goes under, life will become more colourful again) | |
| Moselle | Germany | Traben-Trarbach-Litzig, left riverside | | |
| Mündesee | Germany | Angermünde, north of the village | | |
| Rhine | Germany | Worms-Rheindürkheim, near kilometer 449.4 on the left riverbank | Several stones, years ranging from 1857 to 2009 | Hungerstein im September 2003 im Rhein bei Worms-Rheindürkheim |
| Sava | Slovenia | Near Zidani Most | Like the Maribor Island stone, this one was inscribed with the date 1834 and reappeared in 1921. | |
| Weser | Germany | Near Hajen, on the left riverbank | Red sandstone that was smoothed by the river | Hajener Hungerstein |
| Weser | Germany | Würgassen | 3 m³ hunger stone with the years 1800, 1840, 1842, 1847, 1850, 1857, 1858, 1859, 1865, 1874, 1876, 1881, 1911, 1922, 1934 and 1959 | |

== Common years ==
| Year | Number of hunger stones marked |
|---|---|
| 1115 | 1 |
| 1417 | 1 |
| 1461 | 1 |
| 1616 | 1 |
| 1654 | 1 |
| 1666 | 1 |
| 1681 | 1 |
| 1707 | 2 |
| 1746 | 1 |
| 1778 | 1 |
| 1790 | 1 |
| 1800 | 2 |
| 1811 | 2 |
| 1830 | 1 |
| 1834 | 2 |
| 1840 | 1 |
| 1842 | 3 |
| 1847 | 1 |
| 1850 | 1 |
| 1857 | 2 |
| 1858 | 1 |
| 1859 | 1 |
| 1865 | 1 |
| 1868 | 2 |
| 1874 | 1 |
| 1876 | 1 |
| 1881 | 1 |
| 1892 | 3 |
| 1893 | 3 |
| 1899 | 1 |
| 1903 | 1 |
| 1904 | 5 |
| 1911 | 2 |
| 1921 | 2 |
| 1922 | 1 |
| 1928 | 2 |
| 1930 | 1 |
| 1934 | 1 |
| 1943 | 1 |
| 1947 | 2 |
| 1950 | 1 |
| 1952 | 1 |
| 1959 | 2 |
| 1963 | 3 |
| 1971 | 1 |
| 2003 | 3 |
| 2009 | 1 |
| 2015 | 7 |
| 2016 | 1 |
| 2018 | 6 |

== See also ==
- Nilometer
- Tsunami stone
