= Miracle Pine Tree =

Historical tree

- 奇跡の一本松
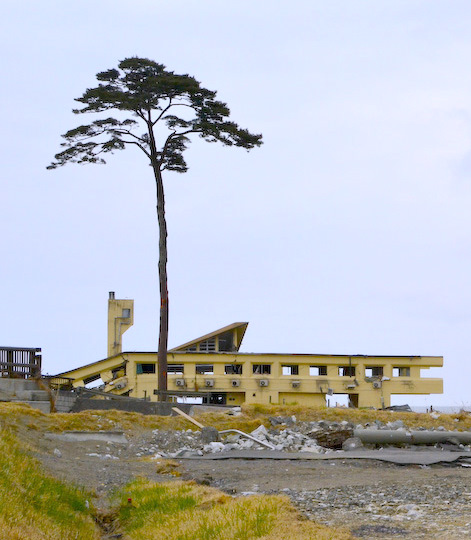
- Interactive map of Miracle Pine Tree
- Location: Japan Rikuzentakata, Iwate
- Coordinates: 39°0′12.48″N 141°37′30.43″E
- Type: Earthquake disaster monument
- Material: Pine (Pinus × densi-thunbergii), Fibre-reinforced plastic, Stainless steel, Plastic and so on
- Width: 15 m (49 ft)
- Height: 27 m (89 ft)
- Beginning date: September 12, 2012
- Completion date: June 30, 2013
- Opening date: July 3, 2013
- Dedicated to: Great East Japan Earthquake

The Miracle Pine Tree (奇跡の一本松, Kiseki no Ippon matsu) was the lone surviving tree of the Takata Pine Forest, which suffered deadly damage from the Great East Japan Earthquake tsunami in March 2011. It was located in Rikuzentakata, Iwate Prefecture. Preserved as a permanent reminder of the Great East Japan Earthquake, it died shortly after the tsunami due to exposure to saltwater.

== Overview ==
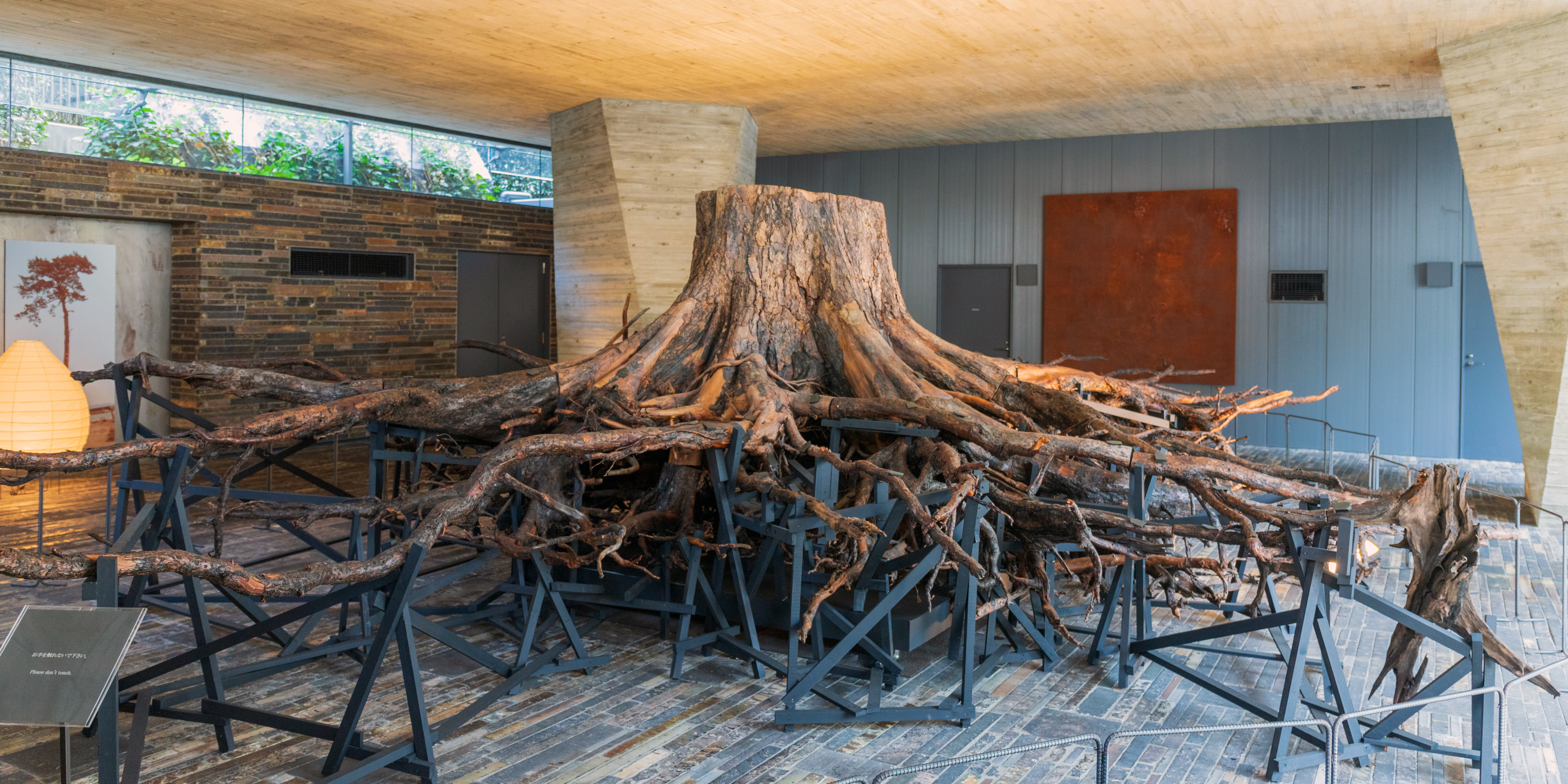
The roots of the Miracle Pine Tree on display in Tokyo in March 2023

In the 2011 Tōhoku earthquake and tsunami, the tsunami was over 10 meters in height at Takata Pine Forest in Rikuzentakata, and almost the entire grove was completely swept away, with the exception of one lone pine tree.

This lone survivor caught the public's imagination as a symbol of hope and was widely reported upon by newspapers worldwide. Also, since one tree survived, the official designation as a "Place of Scenic Beauty" was not revoked. The lone surviving pine died in December 2012 due to seawater contamination of the surrounding soil. Disaster recovery work began in December 2013 with the building of a new sea wall and restoration of the beach, which had been buried in meters of silt. Cleanup efforts were hampered by fears that the wood of the fallen pines had been contaminated by radiation effects from the Fukushima Daiichi nuclear disaster. Tree planting events were held in 2017 and 2018, during which time 2500 pine seedlings were planted by volunteers. The area is now part of the Sanriku Fukkō National Park.

== See also ==
- Takata-matsubara
- Yonezawa Shokai Building - destroyed building located in the same city
