= Rikuzen-Yahagi Station =

Former railway station in Rikuzentakata, Iwate Prefecture, Japan

Rikuzen-Yahagi Station 陸前矢作駅
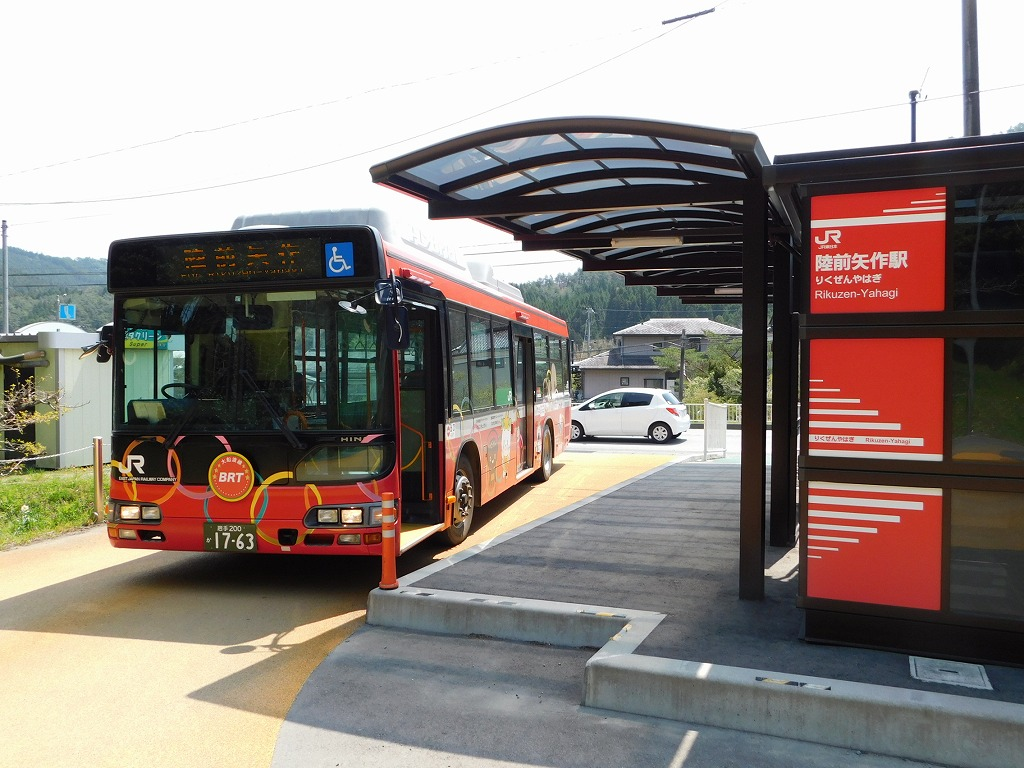
- Rikuzen-Yahagi Station in April 2017

General information
- Location: Yahagi-cho, Rikuzentakata-shi, Iwate-ken; Japan
- Coordinates: 39°01′21″N 141°34′46″E
- Operator: JR East
- Line: ■ Ōfunato Line
- Distance: 79.5 km from Ichinoseki
- Platforms: 2 side platforms

Construction
- Structure type: At grade

Other information
- Status: Unstaffed
- Website: Official website

History
- Opened: 15 February 1933
- Closed: 11 March 2011

Services
| Preceding station | JR East | Following station |
|---|---|---|
| Terminus | Kesennuma / Ōfunato BRT branch service | Takekoma towards Sakari |

Former services
| Preceding station | JR East | Following station |
|---|---|---|
| Kami-Shishiori towards Ichinoseki | Ōfunato Line | Takekoma towards Sakari |
Location
- Location within Japan

Rikuzen-Yahagi Station (陸前矢作駅, Rikuzen-Yahagi-eki) was a JR East railway station located in Rikuzentakata, Iwate Prefecture, Japan. The station was closed following the 2011 Tōhoku earthquake and tsunami and has now been replaced by a provisional bus rapid transit line.

== Lines ==
Rikuzen-Yahagi Station was served by the Ōfunato Line, and is located 79.5 rail kilometers from the terminus of the line at Ichinoseki Station.

== Station layout ==
Rikuzen-Yahagi Station had two opposed side platforms connected by a level crossing. The station was unattended.

=== Platforms ===
| 1 | ■ Ōfunato Line | for Rikuzen-Takata and Sakari |
| 2 | ■ Ōfunato Line | for Ichinoseki and Kesennuma |

== History ==
Rikuzen-Yahagi Station opened on 15 February 1933. The station was absorbed into the JR East network upon the privatization of the Japan National Railways (JNR) on April 1, 1987. The station was one of six stations on the Ōfunato Line closed after the 11 March 2011 Tōhoku earthquake and tsunami. Services have now been replaced by a BRT.

== Surrounding area ==
- National Route 343
- Yahagi River

== See also ==
- List of railway stations in Japan
