= Yonezawa Shokai Building =

Building in Iwate, Japan

- Yonezawa Shōkai Biru (米沢商会ビル)
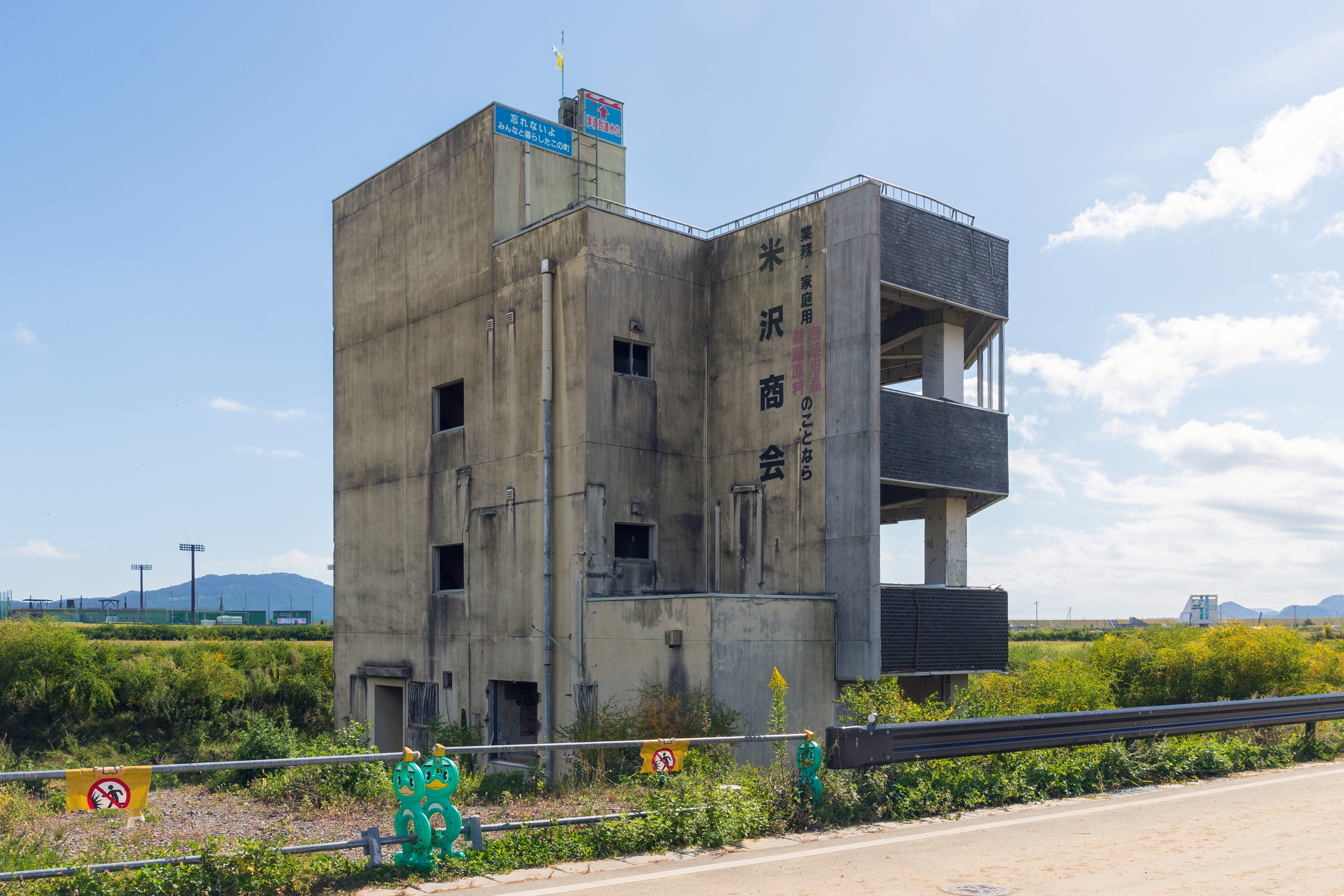
- The building in October 2022

General information
- Status: Destroyed
- Location: Takata-cho, Rikuzentakata, Iwate, Japan
- Coordinates: 39°0′49.5″N 141°37′42.5″E
- Year built: 1970s
- Destroyed: March 11, 2011
- Owner: Yuichi Yonezawa

Height
- Height: 15 metres (49 ft)

Technical details
- Material: Reinforced concrete
- Floor count: 3

The Yonezawa Shokai Building (Japanese: 米沢商会ビル, Hepburn: Yonezawa Shōkai Biru) is an abandoned building and a disaster ruins for the 2011 Tōhoku earthquake and tsunami in Rikuzentakata, Iwate Prefecture, Japan. It is the only building in the old city center left after the tsunami.

It is also known for saving Yuichi Yonezawa, the owner of the building, who climbed the chimney to survive the tsunami.

== Background ==
Yonezawa Shokai Building is a 14-meter-tall (excluding the chimney) three-story building located at the former city center in Takata-cho, Rikuzentakata, Iwate Prefecture. It is owned by the Yonezawa Shokai Company, owned by Yuichi Yonezawa. Yonezawa Shokai Company is a company that packages materials and bento boxes for wholesale and retail business.

== History ==
The building is believed to have been constructed in the 1970s. It was originally used by a life insurance company as the branch for Rikuzentakata. In 2000, Yuichi acquired the building after returning home from work in Tokyo. He used it to expand his father's business.

=== 2011 earthquake and tsunami ===
An earthquake hit Rikuzentakata and toppled shelves inside the building. After clearing up the mess caused by the earthquake, Yuichi returned to the company's warehouse. A tsunami warning was issued in the area. Yuichi then went back to the building to look for his parents and younger brother. After seeing that the tsunami was approaching on the second floor of the building, he quickly climbed up to the roof, then up the ladder of the penthouse, and finally to the building's chimney, which is about 1 square meter (11 sq ft) and about 15 metres (49 ft) high. When the tsunami reached the building, the water level rose to the point that it was only about 20 centimetres (7.9 in) from reaching Yuichi. He was rescued by a helicopter after he wrote SOS on the rooftop using mud.

=== Aftermath ===
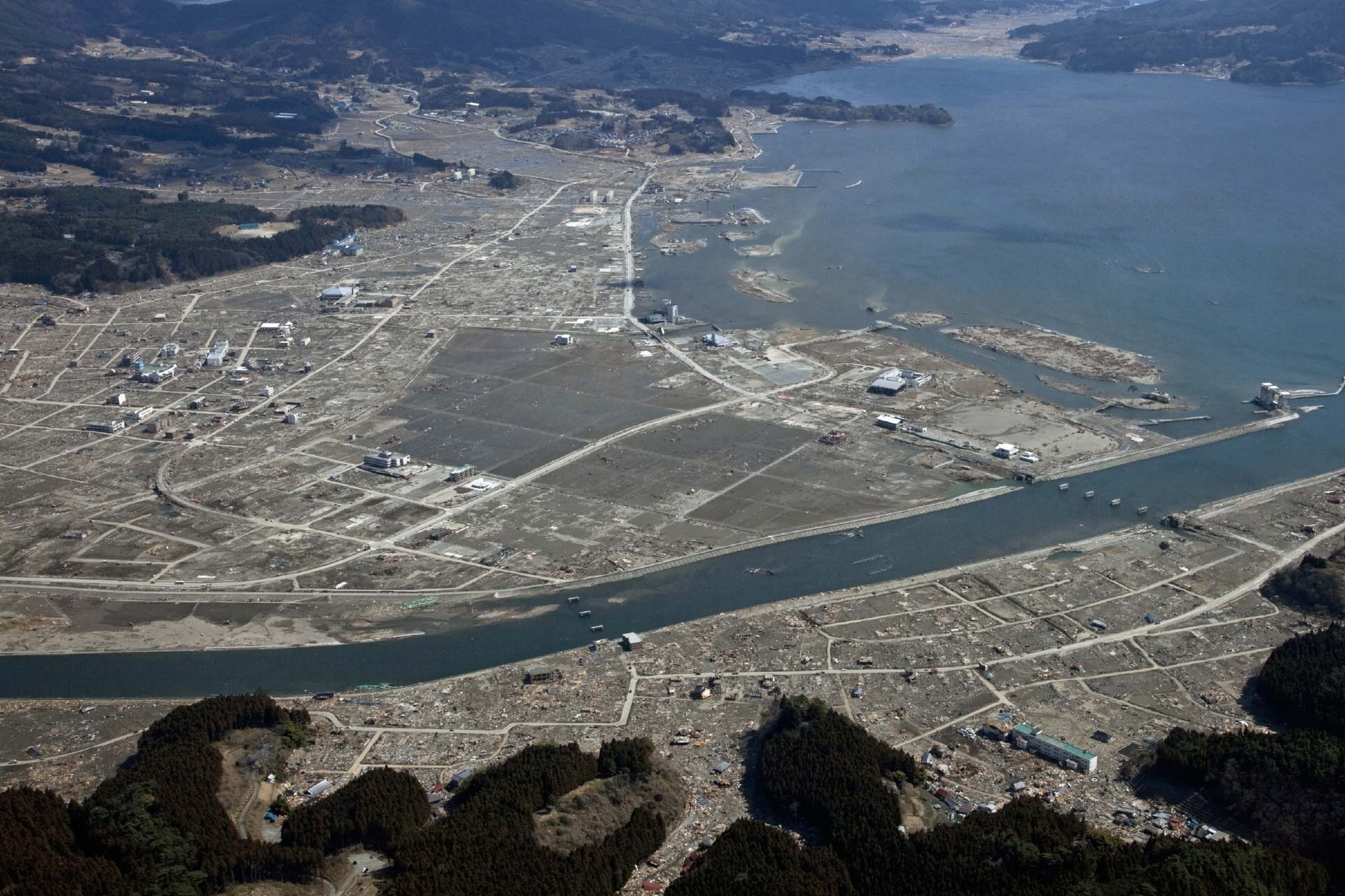
Aerial photo of Rikuzentakata city center following the tsunami

After the tsunami passed, the building was severely damaged. The windows were blown out, and the walls and ceiling were also damaged. An inspection several months after the tsunami showed that there was no damage to the structure of the building.

Two years later, the destroyed buildings in the former city center were demolished. Yuichi was told that if he demolished it would cost ¥7 million (2011) (US$87,711.58), which would be covered by the public funds. After being persuaded by his wife, he decided that he would preserve the building using his own money as a momento for saving his life and in memory of his brother and parents who died in the tsunami.

It is the only building left in the former city center. It became a ruin of the disaster that happened in the city. By February 2024, more than 6,000 people had visited the building. The building has a marker on the top of the building's chimney that says "the level at which the tsunami reached" (津波到達水位, Tsunami Tōtatsu Suii). It is now 2 metres (6.6 ft) below the surrounding area after the land was elevated.

== See also ==
- Tsunami stone
- Miracle Pine Tree - A tree that survived the tsunami, located in the same city
- Modern ruins
