= Rikuzentakata =

Rikuzentakata 陸前高田市
- City
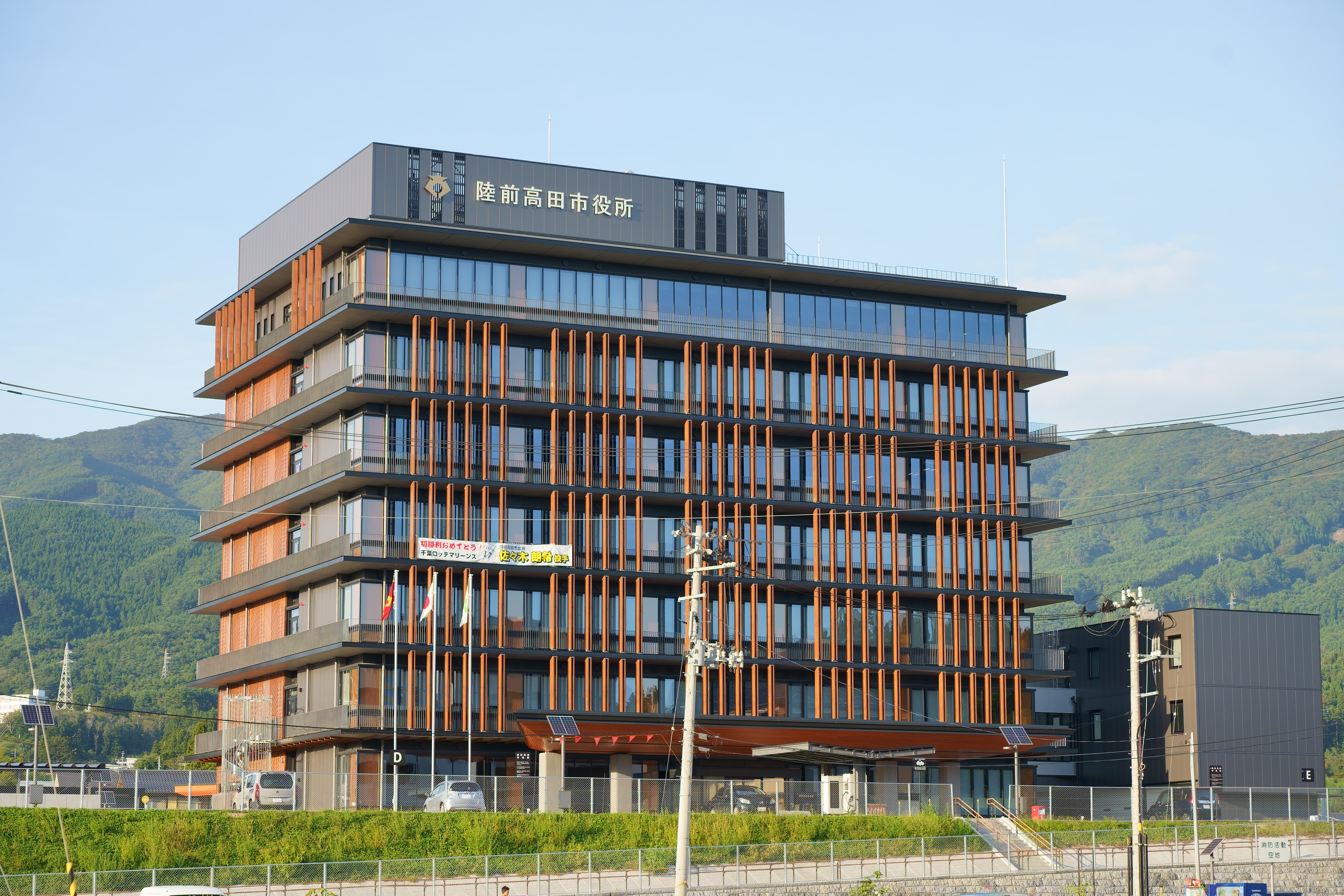
- New Rikuzentakata City Hall

- Flag Seal

- Location of Rikuzentakata in Iwate Prefecture

- Coordinates: 39°01′40.9″N 141°37′31.5″E
- Country: Japan
- Region: Tōhoku
- Prefecture: Iwate

Government
  - -Mayor: Taku Sasaki

Area
  - Total: 231.94 km^{2} (89.55 sq mi)

Population (October 10, 2020)
  - Total: 18,262
  - Density: 78.736/km^{2} (203.92/sq mi)
- Time zone: UTC+9 (Japan Standard Time)
- Phone number: 0192-54-2111
- Climate: Cfa
- Website: Official website
- Symbols
- Bird: Common gull
- Flower: Camellia
- Tree: Cryptomeria

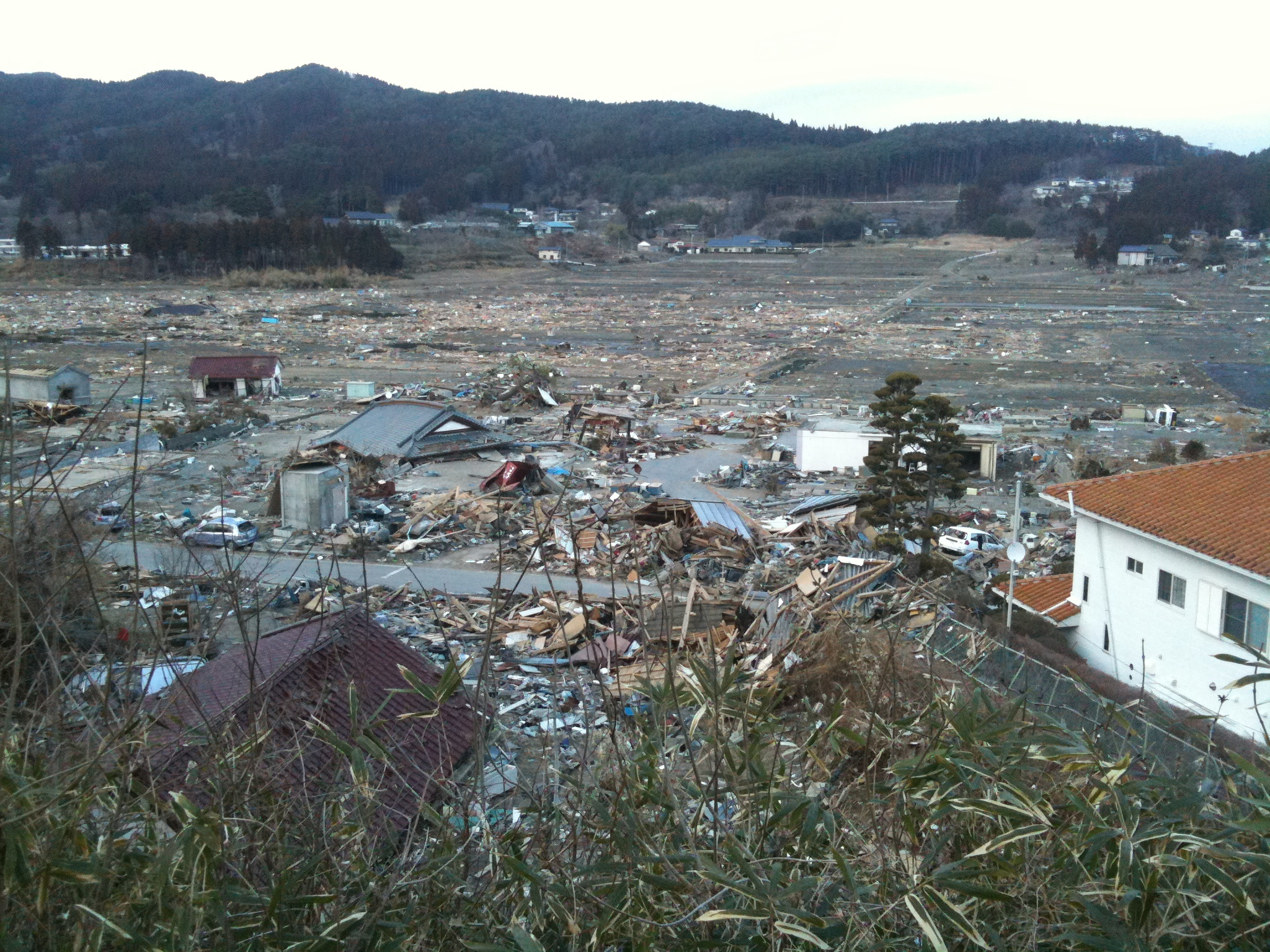
Rikuzentakata after the 2011 earthquake and tsunami

Rikuzentakata (陸前高田市, Rikuzentakata-shi) is a city located in Iwate Prefecture, Japan. In the census of 2010, the city had a population of 23,302 (2005: 24,709), and a population density of 100 persons per km^{2}. The 2011 Tōhoku earthquake and tsunami caused extensive damage to the city. As of 31 March 2020, the city had an estimated population of 19,062, and a population density of 82 persons per km^{2} in 7,593 households. The total area of the city is 231.94 square kilometres (89.55 sq mi).

== Geography ==
Rikuzentakata is located in the far southeast corner of Iwate Prefecture, bordered by the Pacific Ocean to the east. The city contained Lake Furukawanuma until the 2011 tsunami destroyed it. Parts of the coastal area of the city are within the borders of the Sanriku Fukkō National Park.

=== Neighboring municipalities ===
Iwate Prefecture

- Ichinoseki
- Ōfunato
- Sumita

Miyagi Prefecture

- Kesennuma

== Climate ==
Rikuzentakata has a humid subtropical climate (Köppen climate classification Cfa) bordering on an oceanic climate (Köppen climate classification Cfb) with warm summers and cold winters. The average annual temperature is 11.1 °C (52.0 °F). The average annual rainfall is 1,343 millimetres (52.9 in), with September as the wettest month and January as the driest month. The temperatures are highest on average in August, at around 23.7 °C (74.7 °F), and lowest in January, at around 0.0 °C (32.0 °F).

Climate data for Rikuzentakata (2011−2020 normals, extremes 2011−present)
Month	Jan	Feb	Mar	Apr	May	Jun	Jul	Aug	Sep	Oct	Nov	Dec	Year
Record high °C (°F)	12.8 (55.0)	17.6 (63.7)	23.5 (74.3)	29.4 (84.9)	34.4 (93.9)	32.8 (91.0)	36.8 (98.2)	36.0 (96.8)	32.2 (90.0)	28.0 (82.4)	21.4 (70.5)	18.5 (65.3)	36.8 (98.2)
Mean daily maximum °C (°F)	4.2 (39.6)	5.2 (41.4)	9.9 (49.8)	14.6 (58.3)	20.1 (68.2)	22.4 (72.3)	25.9 (78.6)	27.9 (82.2)	24.9 (76.8)	19.2 (66.6)	13.2 (55.8)	6.7 (44.1)	16.2 (61.1)
Daily mean °C (°F)	0.4 (32.7)	0.8 (33.4)	4.7 (40.5)	9.3 (48.7)	14.8 (58.6)	18.0 (64.4)	21.9 (71.4)	23.7 (74.7)	20.3 (68.5)	14.2 (57.6)	8.1 (46.6)	2.6 (36.7)	11.6 (52.8)
Mean daily minimum °C (°F)	−3.0 (26.6)	−3.0 (26.6)	0.1 (32.2)	4.4 (39.9)	10.2 (50.4)	14.5 (58.1)	19.0 (66.2)	20.6 (69.1)	16.7 (62.1)	9.8 (49.6)	3.7 (38.7)	−0.9 (30.4)	7.7 (45.8)
Record low °C (°F)	−10.6 (12.9)	−11.0 (12.2)	−5.6 (21.9)	−3.0 (26.6)	0.7 (33.3)	7.2 (45.0)	14.3 (57.7)	12.7 (54.9)	7.4 (45.3)	1.5 (34.7)	−3.2 (26.2)	−6.2 (20.8)	−11.0 (12.2)
Average precipitation mm (inches)	33.3 (1.31)	34.3 (1.35)	98.2 (3.87)	123.7 (4.87)	113.3 (4.46)	137.9 (5.43)	170.5 (6.71)	167.1 (6.58)	180.3 (7.10)	161.0 (6.34)	69.1 (2.72)	51.5 (2.03)	1,350.9 (53.19)
Average precipitation days (≥ 1.0 mm)	4.8	5.4	7.0	8.3	9.2	10.2	12.6	12.6	11.1	8.7	6.4	6.6	102.9
Source: JMA

== Demographics ==
Per Japanese census data, the population of Rikuzentakata peaked in the 1950s and has declined steadily over the past 70 years.

Historical population
Year	Pop.	±%
1920	20,773	—
1930	24,494	+17.9%
1940	26,222	+7.1%
1950	32,609	+24.4%
1960	31,839	−2.4%
1970	30,308	−4.8%
1980	29,356	−3.1%
1990	27,242	−7.2%
2000	25,676	−5.7%
2010	23,302	−9.2%
2020	18,262	−21.6%

== History ==
The area of present-day Rikuzentakata was part of ancient Mutsu Province, and has been settled since at least the Jōmon period. The area was inhabited by the Emishi people, and came under the control of the imperial dynasty during the early Heian period. During the Sengoku period, the area was dominated by various samurai clans before coming under the control of the Date clan during the Edo period, who ruled Sendai Domain under the Tokugawa shogunate.

The towns of Kesen and Takata were established within Kesen District on April 1, 1889 with the establishment of the modern municipality system. The area was devastated by the 1896 Sanriku earthquake and the 1933 Sanriku earthquake. Kesen and Takata merged with the neighboring town of Hirota and villages of Otomo, Takekoma, Yokota and Yonezaki on January 1, 1955 to form the city of Rikuzentakata.

=== 2011 Tōhoku earthquake and tsunami ===
Rikuzentakata was almost completely destroyed by the tsunami following the Tōhoku earthquake. Maiya Takata, a three-story shopping centre in the city centre, was destroyed and closed in March 2011; the store reopened at a new location in 2017. According to the police, every building smaller than three stories high was completely flooded, including Yonezawa Shokai Building, leaving only the chimney which Yuichi Yonezawa clung to. Buildings more than three stories high flooded partially, one of the buildings being the city hall, where the water also reached as high as the third floor. The Japan Self-Defense Forces initially reported that between 300 and 400 bodies were found in the town. On 14 March, an illustrated BBC report showed a picture of the town, describing it as "almost completely flattened." The town's tsunami shelters were designed for a wave of three to four metres (9.8 to 13.1 ft) in height, but the tsunami of March 2011 created a wave 13 metres (43 ft) high which inundated the designated safe locations. Local officials estimated that 20% to 40% of the town's population was killed. Although the town was prepared for earthquakes and tsunamis and had a 6.5-metre-high (21 ft) seawall, it was not enough and more than 80% of 8,000 houses were swept away.

A BBC film dated 20 March reported that the harbour gates of the town failed to shut as the tsunami approached, and that 45 young firemen were swept away while attempting to close them manually. The same film reported that 500 bodies had been recovered in the town, but that 10,000 people were still unaccounted-for out of a population of 26,000. As of 3 April 2011, 1,000 people from the town were confirmed dead with 1,300 still missing. In late May 2011, an Australian reporter interviewed a surviving volunteer firefighter who said 49 firefighters were killed in Rikuzentakata by the tsunami, among 284 firefighters known to have died along the affected coast, many while closing the doors of the tsunami barriers along the seashore.

Sixty-eight city officials, about one-third of the city's municipal employees, were killed. The town's mayor at the time, Futoshi Toba, was at his post at the city hall and survived, but his wife was killed at their seaside home. The wave severely damaged the artifact and botanical collection at the city's museum and killed all six staff. The final death toll was 1,656 killed and 223 missing and presumed dead. Portions of the city subsided by over a meter.

As a countermeasure against future tsunami, Rikuzentakata's city centre was elevated upon rock fill in a megaproject. In 2014, a massive conveyor belt system was being used to carry rock from a hill across the Kesen River from the city centre. The conveyor belt system featured a long suspension span that crossed the Kesen River, and was named the "Bridge of Hope." The project elevated the city centre by more than 10 metres (33 ft).

Currently a new marketplace and community center has been established upon one such elevated plot of land, and work is ongoing to create a new street grid. In addition, new bridges are being established across the Kesen River, including an extension and bypass for the Sanriku Expressway and Japan National Route 45. The location of the rock quarry for the reconstruction megaproject is being developed as a new neighborhood.

== Government ==
Rikuzentakata has a mayor-council form of government with a directly elected mayor and a unicameral city legislature of 18 members. Rikuzentaka, together with the town of Sumita together contributes one seat to the Iwate Prefectural legislature. In terms of national politics, the city is part of Iwate 2nd district of the lower house of the Diet of Japan.

== Economy ==
The local economy of Rikuzentakata is based heavily on commercial fishing and food processing. As of 2011, oyster farming produced ¥40 million in annual sales for the city.

== Education ==
Rikuzentakata has eight public elementary schools and two public junior high schools operated by the city government, and one public high school operated by the Iwate Prefectural Board of Education. There is also one private high school.

== Transportation ==
=== Railway ===
East Japan Railway Company (JR East) - Ōfunato Line (services suspended indefinitely and replaced by a BRT)

- Rikuzen-Yahagi - Takekoma - Rikuzen-Takata - Wakinosawa - Otomo

=== Highway ===
- Sanriku Expressway
- National Route 45
- National Route 340
- National Route 343

== Local attractions ==
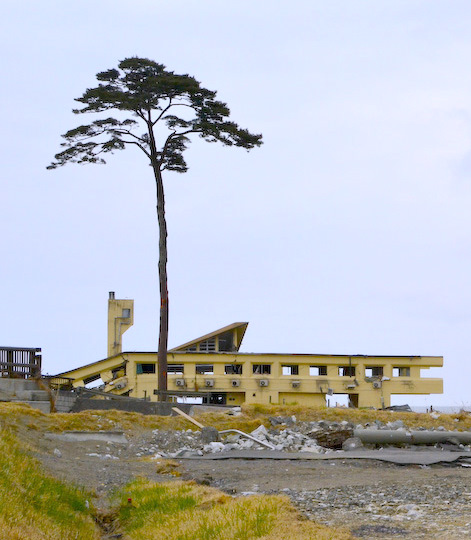
The Miracle Pine at the site of Takata-Matsubara

=== Takata-matsubara ===
Takata-matsubara (高田松原) was a two-kilometre stretch of shoreline that was lined with approximately seventy thousand pines. In 1927 it was selected as one of the 100 Landscapes of Japan (Shōwa era) and in 1940 it was designated a Place of Scenic Beauty. After the 2011 tsunami a single, ten-metre, two-hundred-year-old tree known as the Miracle Pine remained from the forest. Due to land subsidence and coastal erosion this was only five metres from the sea and was at threat from increased salinity. The Association for the Protection of Takata-Matsubara along with the municipal and prefectural governments took measures, including the erection of barriers, to protect the surviving pine.

As of September 2011, there were signs that these measures had failed, and that the tree was dead due to salt water poisoning. In September 2012, the tree was felled for preservation and replaced in 2013 with an artificial "commemorative tree".

== Notable people from Rikuzentakata ==
- Naoya Hatakeyama, photographer
- Toru Kikawada, politician
- Hiroaki Murakami, actor
- Roki Sasaki, baseball player

== Sister cities ==
Rikuzentakata is twinned with:

- Crescent City, United States (2018)
