= Yonezawa (surname) =

Yonezawa (written: 米澤 or 米沢) is a Japanese surname. Notable people with the surname include:

- Akinori Yonezawa (born 1947), Japanese computer scientist
- Atsushi Yonezawa (米澤 淳司; born 1985), Japanese footballer
- Honobu Yonezawa (born 1978), Japanese writer
- Madoka Yonezawa (米澤 円; born 1982), Japanese voice actress and singer
- Takeshi Yonezawa (born 1969), Japanese footballer
- Toru Yonezawa (米沢 徹; born 1958), Japanese tennis player
- Yoshihiro Yonezawa (1953–2006), Japanese manga author
