= Sumita, Iwate =

Sumita 住田町
- Town
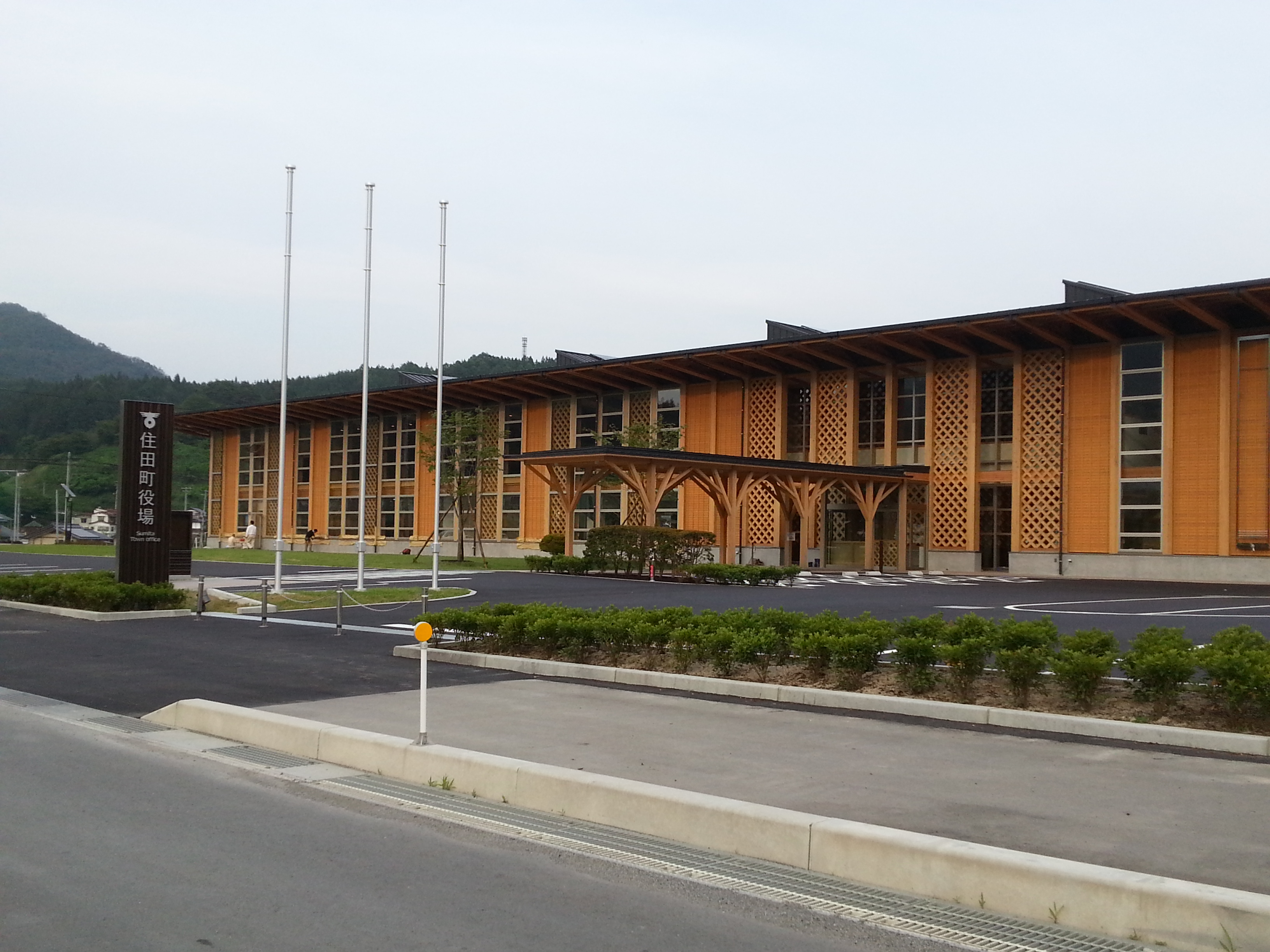
- Sumita Town Hall

- Flag Seal

- Location of Sumita in Iwate Prefecture

- Location within Japan
- Coordinates: 39°08′32″N 141°34′30″E
- Country: Japan
- Region: Tōhoku
- Prefecture: Iwate
- District: Kesen

Government
  - Mayor: Ken'ichi Kanda

Area
  - Total: 334.84 km^{2} (129.28 sq mi)

Population (July 31, 2023)
  - Total: 4,977
  - Density: 14.86/km^{2} (38.50/sq mi)
- Population total includes non-Japanese residents
- Time zone: UTC+9 (Japan Standard Time)
- Phone number: 0192-46-2111
- Address: Setamai, Kawamukai 88-1, Sumita-cho, Kensen-gun, Iwate-ken 029-2396
- Climate: Cfa
- Website: Official website
- Symbols
- Bird: Copper pheasant
- Flower: Large-flowered cypripedium
- Tree: Cryptomeria

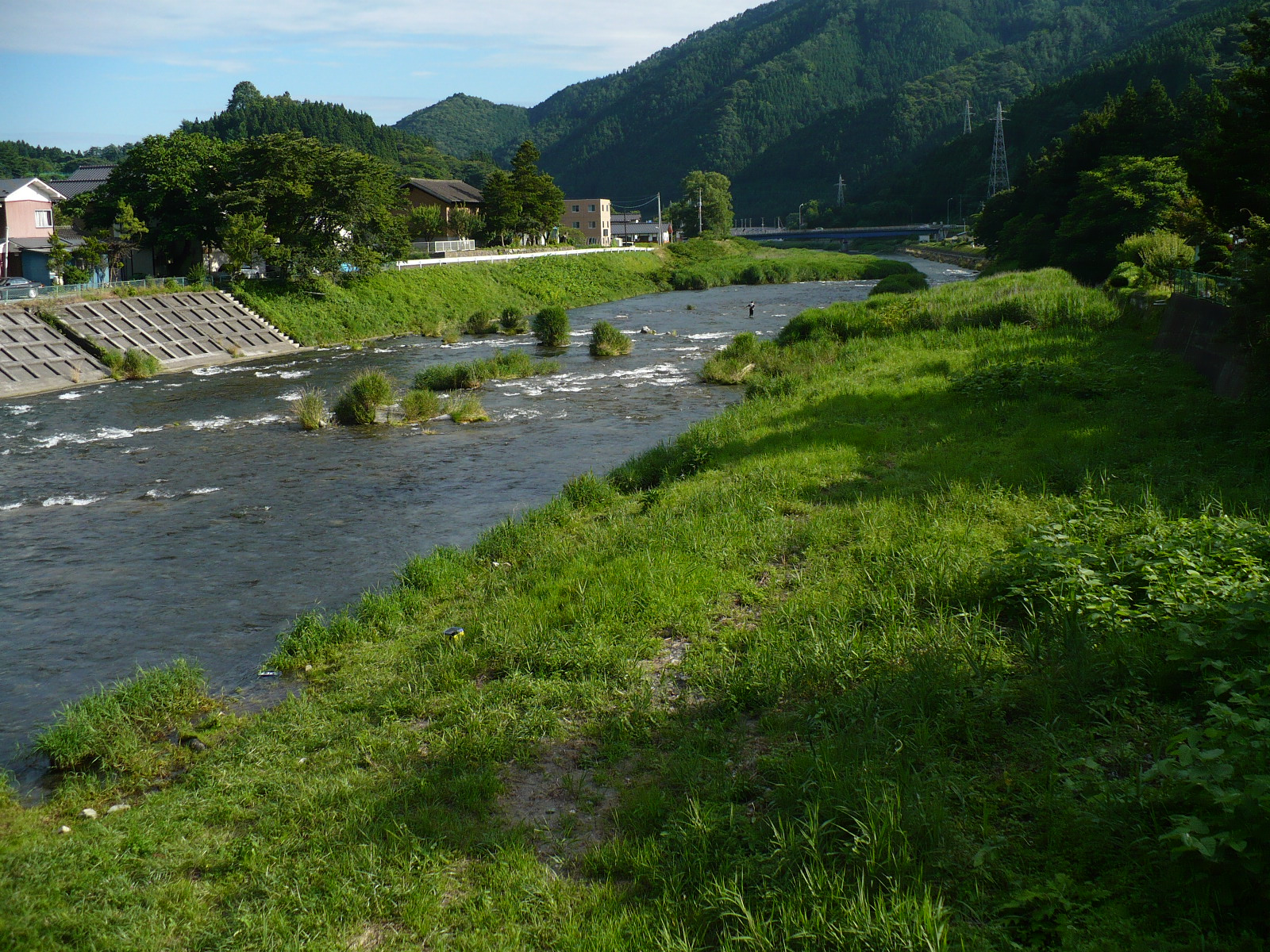
The Kesen River in Sumita

Sumita (住田町, Sumita-chō) is a town located in Iwate Prefecture, Japan. As of 31 July 2023, the town had a population of 4,977, and a population density of 15 persons per km^{2} in 2142 households. The total area of the town is 334.84 square kilometres (129.28 sq mi).

== Geography ==
Sumita is located in a basin in southeastern Iwate Prefecture in the southern Kitakami Mountains, surrounded by peaks with an elevation of between 600 and 1500 meters an all sides. Approximately 90% of the town's area is covered by forest and mountains.

=== Neighboring municipalities ===
Iwate Prefecture

- Ichinoseki
- Kamaishi
- Ōfunato
- Ōshū
- Rikuzentakata
- Tōno

=== Climate ===
Sumita has a humid continental climate (Köppen climate classification Dfa) with warm summers and cold winters. The average annual temperature in Sumita is 10.4 °C. The average annual rainfall is 1379 mm with September as the wettest month and January as the driest month. The temperatures are highest on average in August, at around 23.1 °C, and lowest in January, at around -1.2 °C.

Climate data for Sumita (1991−2020 normals, extremes 1978−present)
Month	Jan	Feb	Mar	Apr	May	Jun	Jul	Aug	Sep	Oct	Nov	Dec	Year
Record high °C (°F)	15.2 (59.4)	17.7 (63.9)	22.6 (72.7)	29.5 (85.1)	33.8 (92.8)	34.5 (94.1)	36.0 (96.8)	36.7 (98.1)	35.7 (96.3)	28.9 (84.0)	23.3 (73.9)	20.0 (68.0)	36.7 (98.1)
Mean daily maximum °C (°F)	3.5 (38.3)	4.5 (40.1)	8.6 (47.5)	14.7 (58.5)	20.0 (68.0)	23.2 (73.8)	26.6 (79.9)	28.1 (82.6)	24.4 (75.9)	18.8 (65.8)	12.5 (54.5)	6.1 (43.0)	15.9 (60.7)
Daily mean °C (°F)	−0.6 (30.9)	−0.2 (31.6)	3.1 (37.6)	8.6 (47.5)	14.1 (57.4)	18.0 (64.4)	21.8 (71.2)	23.0 (73.4)	19.3 (66.7)	13.0 (55.4)	6.7 (44.1)	1.6 (34.9)	10.7 (51.3)
Mean daily minimum °C (°F)	−4.5 (23.9)	−4.4 (24.1)	−1.7 (28.9)	2.8 (37.0)	8.7 (47.7)	13.8 (56.8)	18.3 (64.9)	19.4 (66.9)	15.4 (59.7)	8.3 (46.9)	1.9 (35.4)	−2.1 (28.2)	6.3 (43.4)
Record low °C (°F)	−15.2 (4.6)	−15.4 (4.3)	−13.4 (7.9)	−5.4 (22.3)	−1.3 (29.7)	3.0 (37.4)	8.0 (46.4)	9.9 (49.8)	4.8 (40.6)	−1.4 (29.5)	−5.4 (22.3)	−12.7 (9.1)	−15.4 (4.3)
Average precipitation mm (inches)	43.1 (1.70)	37.4 (1.47)	90.6 (3.57)	104.3 (4.11)	125.0 (4.92)	143.0 (5.63)	184.2 (7.25)	171.3 (6.74)	187.2 (7.37)	137.5 (5.41)	81.3 (3.20)	57.1 (2.25)	1,365 (53.74)
Average precipitation days (≥ 1.0 mm)	8.1	7.4	9.7	9.5	10.7	10.5	13.0	11.4	12.0	10.7	9.5	9.2	121.7
Mean monthly sunshine hours	132.5	130.0	164.4	184.1	187.8	153.6	136.8	152.1	131.6	142.6	138.3	114.4	1,769.2
Source: JMA

== Demographics ==
Per Japanese census data, the population of Sumita peaked in the 1950s and has declined over the past 60 years. It is now much less than it was a century ago.

Historical population
Year	Pop.	±%
1920	10,113	—
1930	11,049	+9.3%
1940	11,503	+4.1%
1950	12,760	+10.9%
1960	12,619	−1.1%
1970	10,397	−17.6%
1980	9,036	−13.1%
1990	8,228	−8.9%
2000	7,305	−11.2%
2010	6,190	−15.3%
2020	5,315	−14.1%

== History ==
The area of present-day Sumita was part of ancient Mutsu Province. It was under the control of the Date clan during the Edo period, who ruled the Sendai Domain under the Tokugawa shogunate.

The villages of Kamiarisu, Shimoarisu and Setamai within Kesen District were created on April 1, 1889, with the establishment of the modern municipalities system. Setamai became a town on April 29, 1940. Kamiarisu and Shimoarisu merged with Setamai on April 1, 1955, to create the town of Sumita.

== Government ==
Sumita has a mayor-council form of government with a directly elected mayor and a unicameral town council of 12 members. Sumita, together with the city of Rikuzentakata contributes one seat to the Iwate Prefectural legislature. In terms of national politics, the town is part of Iwate 2nd district of the lower house of the Diet of Japan.

== Economy ==
The local economy consists largely of forestry and agriculture, with pig farming contributing to over half of the town's agricultural production.

== Education ==
Sumita has two public elementary schools and two public middle schools operated by the local board of education. There is one public high school operated by the Iwate Prefectural Board of Education.

== Transportation ==
=== Railway ===
East Japan Railway Company (JR East) - Kamaishi Line

- Kamiarisu

=== Highway ===
- National Route 107
- National Route 340
- National Route 397
