= Meitetsu KiHa 10 series =

Railbus formerly used by Meitetsu

The Meitetsu KiHa 10 series (名鉄キハ10形気動車) was a type of Railbus used by Meitetsu from 1984 to 2004, and used by Kurihara Den'en Railway from 1995 to 2007, when the only line of the company was closed. The 20 series and 30 series were transferred to Myanmar Railways in 2004, although the current status of them are completely unknown.

The 10 series and their improved models, Meitetsu KiHa 20 series and Meitetsu KiHa 30 series will also be mentioned here.

== History ==
=== Background ===
Although Meitetsu owned a large network of railways spanning across Aichi and Gifu Prefecture from mergers with many local railways, some of sections were rarely used, or experienced a fall in ridership due to motorization. Meitetsu saw prototype railbuses developed by Fuji Heavy Industries as a solution, and planned replacing electric multiple unit trains on those sections with railbuses to remove the electrification equipments which reduces upkeep costs.

Although all lines owned by Meitetsu were electrified, the company had experience in running and maintaining diesel multiple unit trains, such as KiHa 8000 series which provided service to Takayama through the Takayama Main Line owned by Japanese National Railways. However, some employees were concerned about the potential lack of performance and lack of comfortability of railbuses, and preferred continuing to run electric multiple unit trains. The executives of Meitetsu at the time wanted to introduce railbuses expecting local residents to be happy about new cars being introduced to local lines. Test run on Meitetsu Yaotsu Line using the prototype railbuses were done, which showed that railbuses took longer than the electric multiple units, but the current service intervals were still able to be maintained. Hunting oscillation was observed during the test run, but the executives dismissed this as an unavoidable issue and approved introducing railbuses.

=== Introduction and retirement ===
The Meitetsu KiHa 10 series were introduced between 1984 and 1985, and the improved 20 series were introduced in 1987. 30 series were introduced in 1995 to replace the 10 series. The electrification equipments on the Yaotsu line, the Hiromi Line section between Shin Kani and Mitake, the Mikawa Line section between Nishi Nakagane and Sanage, the section between Hekinan and Kira Yoshida were removed due to the introduction of railbuses.

However, the introduction of railbuses did not stop the fall in ridership on all sections they were introduced on. The Yaotsu line closed in October 2001, and both of the mentioned sections on the Mikawa line were closed in March 2004, with the section on Hiromi line being re-electrified. All railbuses were retired following this event. Since then, Meitetsu never reintroduced railbuses for lines with low ridership due to its low lifespan and lack of feasibility even after removing electrification equipments.

Two of the six 10 series trains replaced by the 30 series in March 1995 were transferred to the Kurihara Den'en Railway, while the rest were decommissioned. The 20 series and 30 series were transferred to the Myanmar railways following the closure of the Mikawa line sections and Yaotsu line.

== 10 series ==
Meitetsu KiHa 10 series
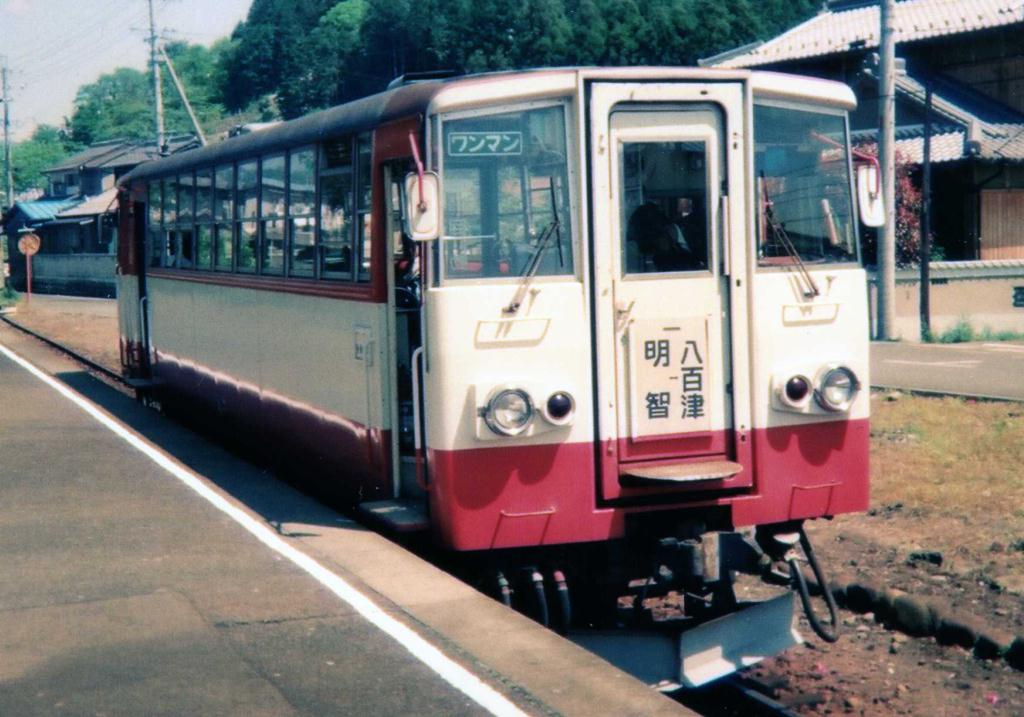
- 10 series in Yaotsu Station
- Stock type: Railbus
- In service: 1984–1995
- Manufacturer: Fuji Heavy Industries
- Constructed: 1984-1985
- Entered service: 1984-1985
- Scrapped: 1995
- Number built: six vehicles
- Number in service: 0
- Number preserved: one
- Number scrapped: five
- Formation: one car per set, capable of two-car formations
- Fleet numbers: 11–16
- Capacity: 90 (36 seats)
- Operator: Meitetsu

Specifications
- Car body construction: Steel
- Car length: 12.5 m (41 ft 0 in)
- Doors: Two pairs per side
- Track gauge: 1,067 mm (3 ft 6 in)

The 10 series were constructed using feedback from prototype railbuses used in test runs on Yaotsu line. The railbus expected usage in two-car formation on rush hours and therefore has a gangway connection on the front. As the name "Railbus" suggests, the railbus uses equipments for buses, such as the engine, broadcasting system, and air conditioners. The first three cars did not come with an air conditioner, while the other three came with one. The train was painted in Ivory and scarlet. This color scheme was used for all future Meitetsu railbuses. The 10 series serviced the Yaotsu line in 1984, but this was expanded to sections in the Mikawa line and the Hiromi line a year later.

The 10 series aged quickly due to its simple system, and were all replaced by the 30 series in 1995. Car number 11 to 14 were scrapped, while number 15 and 16 were transferred to the Kurihara Den'en Railway. The number 15 and 16 were renamed to KD 10 series with the newly assigned number KD11 and KD12. The two cars were retired following the Kurihara Den'en Railway's closure, and is now preserved in Wakayanagi.

== 20 series ==
Meitetsu KiHa 20 series
- 20 series in Sanage Station
- Stock type: Railbus
- In service: 1987–2004
- Manufacturer: Fuji Heavy Industries
- Constructed: 1987, 1990
- Scrapped: Unknown (Note: None of the cars were scrapped by Meitetsu, current status of the cars unknown. Last information available was in 2018)
- Number built: five vehicles
- Number in service: Unknown
- Formation: one car per set, capable of two-car formations
- Fleet numbers: 21–25
- Capacity: 100 (36 seats)
- Operator: Meitetsu

Specifications
- Car body construction: Steel
- Car length: 15.5 m (50 ft 10 in)
- Doors: Two pairs per side
- Track gauge: 1,067 mm (3 ft 6 in)

The 20 series is three meters longer than the predecessor 10 series, and has a larger capacity with increased performances. The railbus still uses many parts from buses, but were equipped with better engines and bogies.

A single car was introduced in 1987 to service the Sanage side of the Mikawa line. Four additional cars were built and introduced in 1990 following the increase in de-electrified railway sections to service the Hekinan side of the Mikawa line. Two cars were transferred to the Myanmar Railway in 2001 upon the closure of the Yaotsu line. The other three were transferred as well in 2004, when the sections on the Mikawa line closed.

Upon being transferred, the trains were classified as RBE 2500 series and were assigned the numbers RBE2501 to RBE2505. The ivory-scarlet color scheme was kept during its first years in Myanmar, and other non-electric cars that were transferred from Japanese railway companies were repainted to the same color scheme. After May 2008, all existing cars were repainted to a different, cream-vermilion color scheme. Although the Myanmar Railway used the push–pull train method, the cars broke frequently as they were not designed to be used that way. The cars were changed to be run in a two-car formation on the spring of 2009.

The current status of the cars are unknown with the last information from 2018. RBE2501 and RBE2505 was unused as of 2018, and RBE2502, RBE2503 were upgraded and converted to VIP-only cars. RBE2504 was last seen being sent to railways in the Pyay region.

== 30 series ==
Meitetsu KiHa 30 series
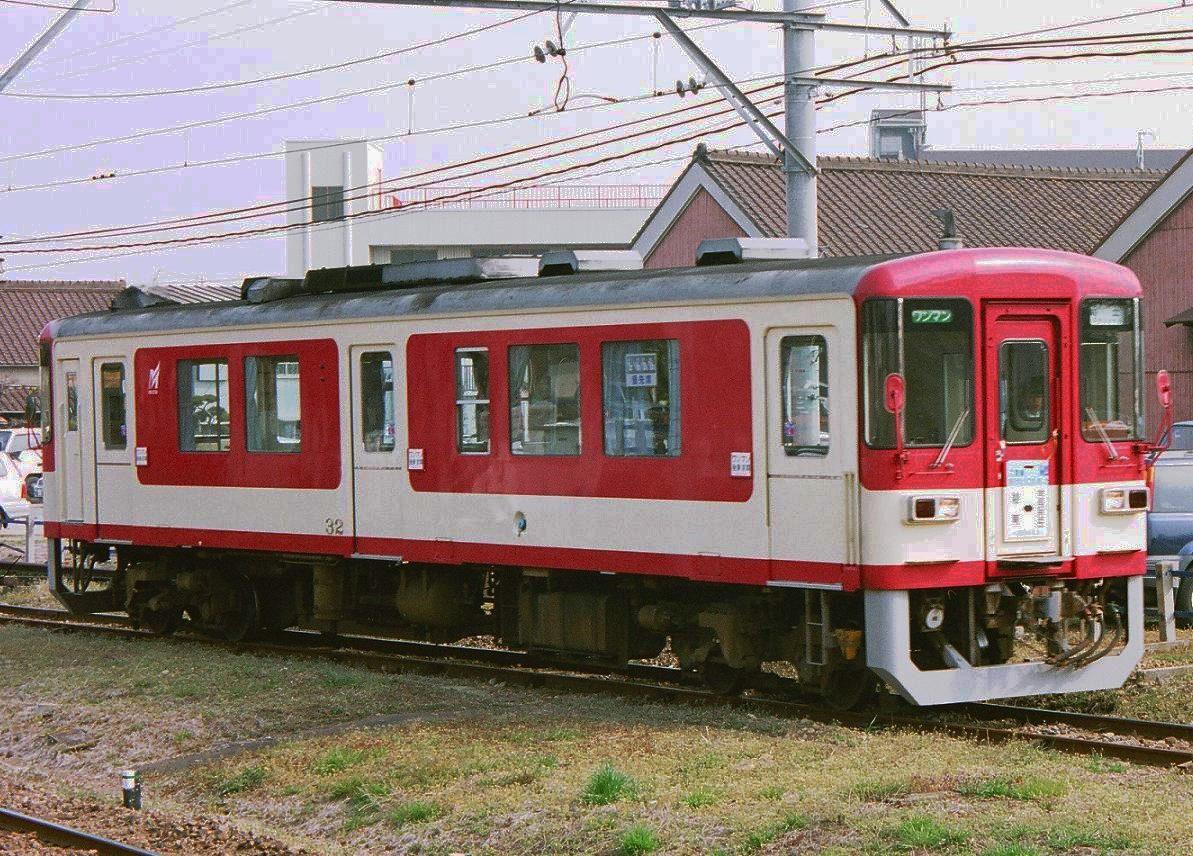
- 30 series in Hekinan Station
- Stock type: Railbus
- In service: 1995-2004
- Manufacturer: Fuji Heavy Industries
- Constructed: 1995
- Scrapped: Unknown
- Number built: four vehicles
- Number in service: Unknown
- Formation: one car per set, capable of two-car formations
- Fleet numbers: 31–34
- Capacity: 110 (36 seats)
- Operator: Meitetsu

Specifications
- Car body construction: Steel
- Car length: 16.5 m (54 ft 2 in)
- Doors: Three pairs per side
- Track gauge: 1,067 mm (3 ft 6 in)

The 30 series were constructed in February 1995 to replace the existing 10 series. The car increased in length by a further meter, and an additional pair of doors were installed in the middle. The railbus uses the same color scheme of ivory and scarlet like its predecessors, but the area of scarlet has increased. Some cars serviced the Yaotsu line until its closure in 2001, when all of them were reassigned to service the Mikawa line sections. The 30 series were stopped from servicing the Hekinan side of the Mikawa line sections to avoid confusion as the 30 series was incompatible with being connected to the 20 series. After the Mikawa line sections closed in 2004, all cars were transferred to the Myanmar Railway, with all cars reassigned the number RBE2506 to RBE2509.
