= Tajiri Station =

Railway station in Ōsaki, Miyagi Prefecture, Japan

Tajiri Station 田尻駅
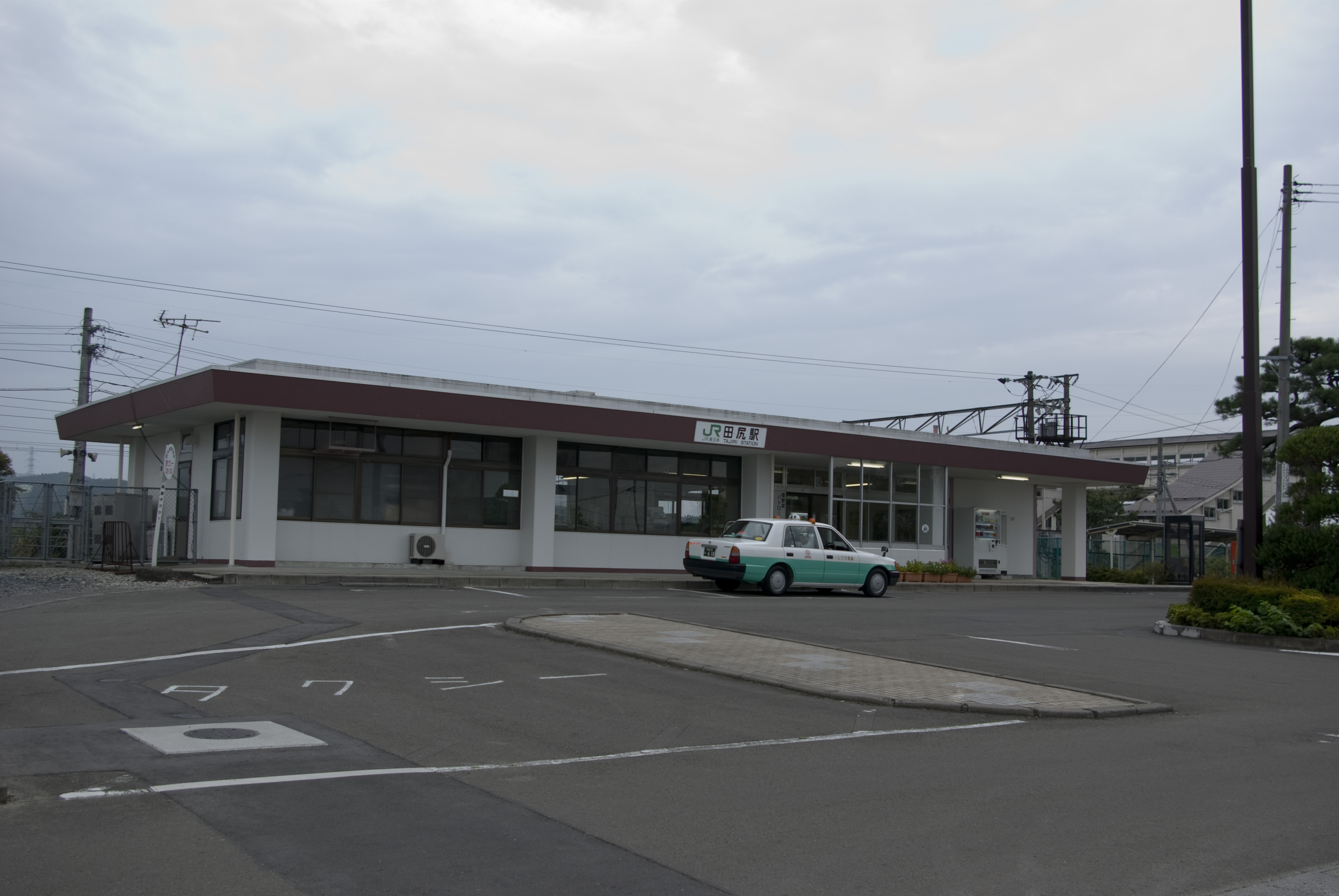
- Tajiri Station, December 2009

General information
- Location: 102-4 Semine Shimoda, Ōsaki-shi, Miyagi-ken 989-4308; Japan
- Coordinates: 38.5964°N 141.0591°E
- Operator: JR East
- Line: ■ Tōhoku Main Line
- Distance: 401.1 km from Tokyo
- Platforms: 2 side platforms
- Tracks: 2

Construction
- Structure type: At grade

Other information
- Status: Unstaffed
- Website: Official website

History
- Opened: December 25, 1908

Passengers
- FY2017: 434 daily

Services
Preceding station	JR East	Following station
Kogota towards Kuroiso	Tōhoku Main Line Local	Semine towards Morioka
Location
- Location within Miyagi Prefecture Location within Japan

Tajiri Station (田尻駅, Tajiri-eki) is a railway station in the city of Ōsaki, Miyagi Prefecture, Japan, operated by East Japan Railway Company (JR East).

== Lines ==
Tajiri Station is served by the Tōhoku Main Line, and is located 401.1 rail kilometers from the official starting point of the line at Tokyo Station.

== Station layout ==
The station has two ground-level opposed side platforms connected to the station building by a footbridge. The station is unattended.

=== Platforms ===
1	■ Tōhoku Main Line	for Ishikoshi and Ichinoseki
2	■ Tōhoku Main Line	for Kogota and Sendai

== History ==
Tajiri Station opened on December 25, 1908. The station was absorbed into the JR East network upon the privatization of the Japanese National Railways (JNR) on April 1, 1987.

== Passenger statistics ==
In fiscal 2017, the station was used by an average of 434 passengers daily (boarding passengers only).

== Surrounding area ==
- Tajiri High School
- Tajiri Town Hall
- Tajiri Community Center

== See also ==
- List of railway stations in Japan
