= Semine Station =

Railway station in Kurihara, Miyagi Prefecture, Japan

Semine Station 瀬峰駅
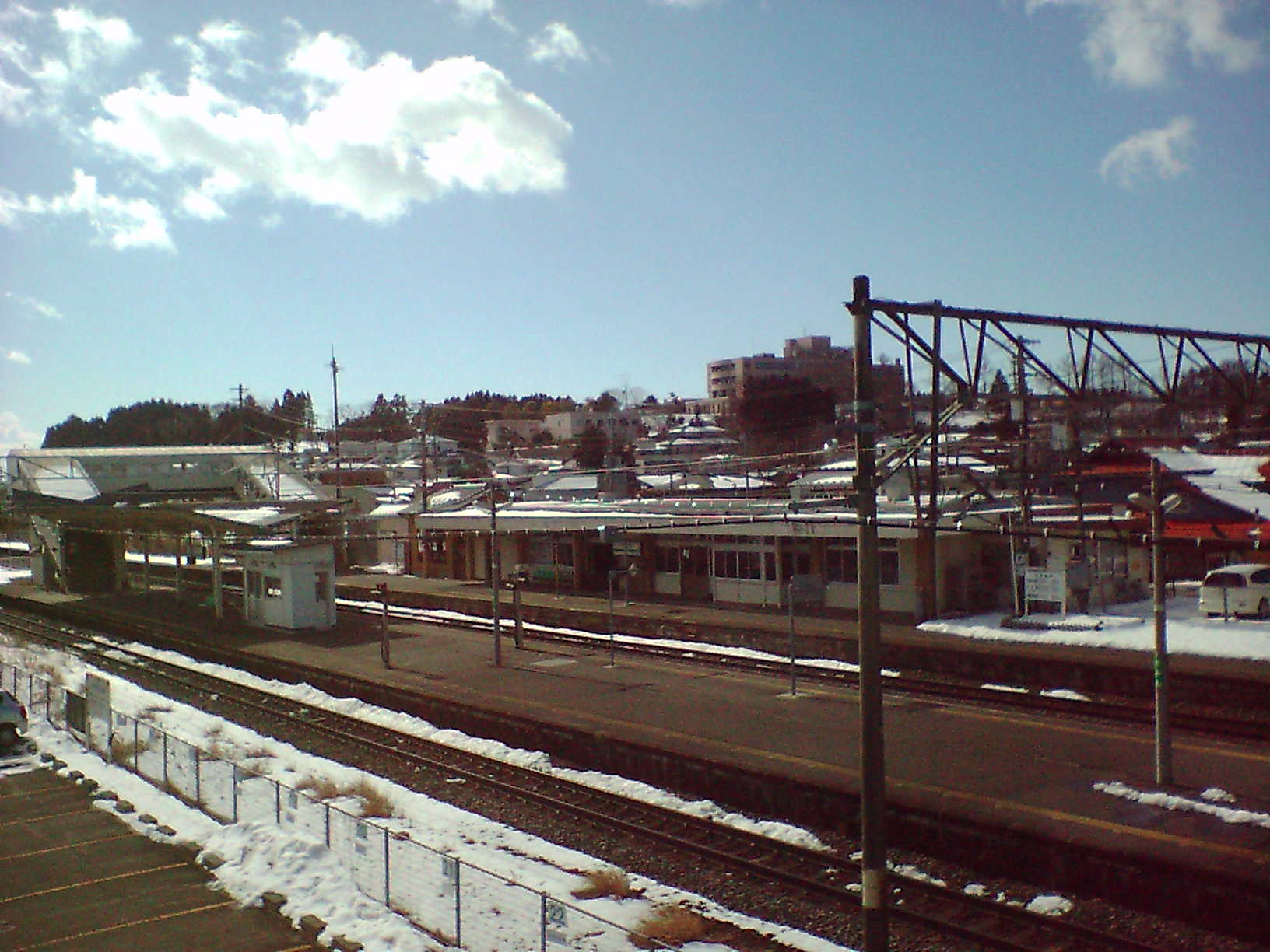
- Semine Station, February 2006

General information
- Location: 102-4 Semine Shimoda, Kurihara-hi, Miyagi-ken 987-2200; Japan
- Coordinates: 38.6554°N 141.0739°E
- Operator: JR East
- Line: ■ Tōhoku Main Line
- Distance: 407.8 km from Tokyo
- Platforms: 1 side + 1 island platform
- Tracks: 3

Construction
- Structure type: At grade

Other information
- Status: Staffed ("Midori no Madoguchi")
- Website: Official website

History
- Opened: April 16, 1890

Passengers
- FY2018: 488 daily

Services
Preceding station	JR East	Following station
Tajiri towards Kuroiso	Tōhoku Main Line Local	Umegasawa towards Morioka
Location
- Location within Miyagi Prefecture Location within Japan

Semine Station (瀬峰駅, Semine-eki) is a railway station in the city of Kurihara, Miyagi Prefecture, Japan, operated by East Japan Railway Company (JR East).

== Lines ==
Semine Station is served by the Tōhoku Main Line, and is located 407.8 rail kilometers from the official starting point of the line at Tokyo Station.

== Station layout ==
Semine Station has a side platform and one island platform connected to the station building by a footbridge. The station has a "Midori no Madoguchi" staffed ticket office.

=== Platforms ===
1	■ Tōhoku Main Line	for Ishikoshi and Ichinoseki
2	■ Tōhoku Main Line	not in normal use
2	■ Tōhoku Main Line	for Kogota and Sendai

== History ==
Semine Station opened on April 16, 1890. From 1921-1968, the station also served the Senboku Railway. The station was absorbed into the JR East network upon the privatization of the Japanese National Railways (JNR) on April 1, 1987.

== Passenger statistics ==
In fiscal 2018, the station was used by an average of 488 passengers daily (boarding passengers only).

== See also ==
- List of railway stations in Japan
