= Umegasawa Station =

Railway station in Tome, Miyagi Prefecture, Japan

Umegasawa Station 梅ヶ沢駅
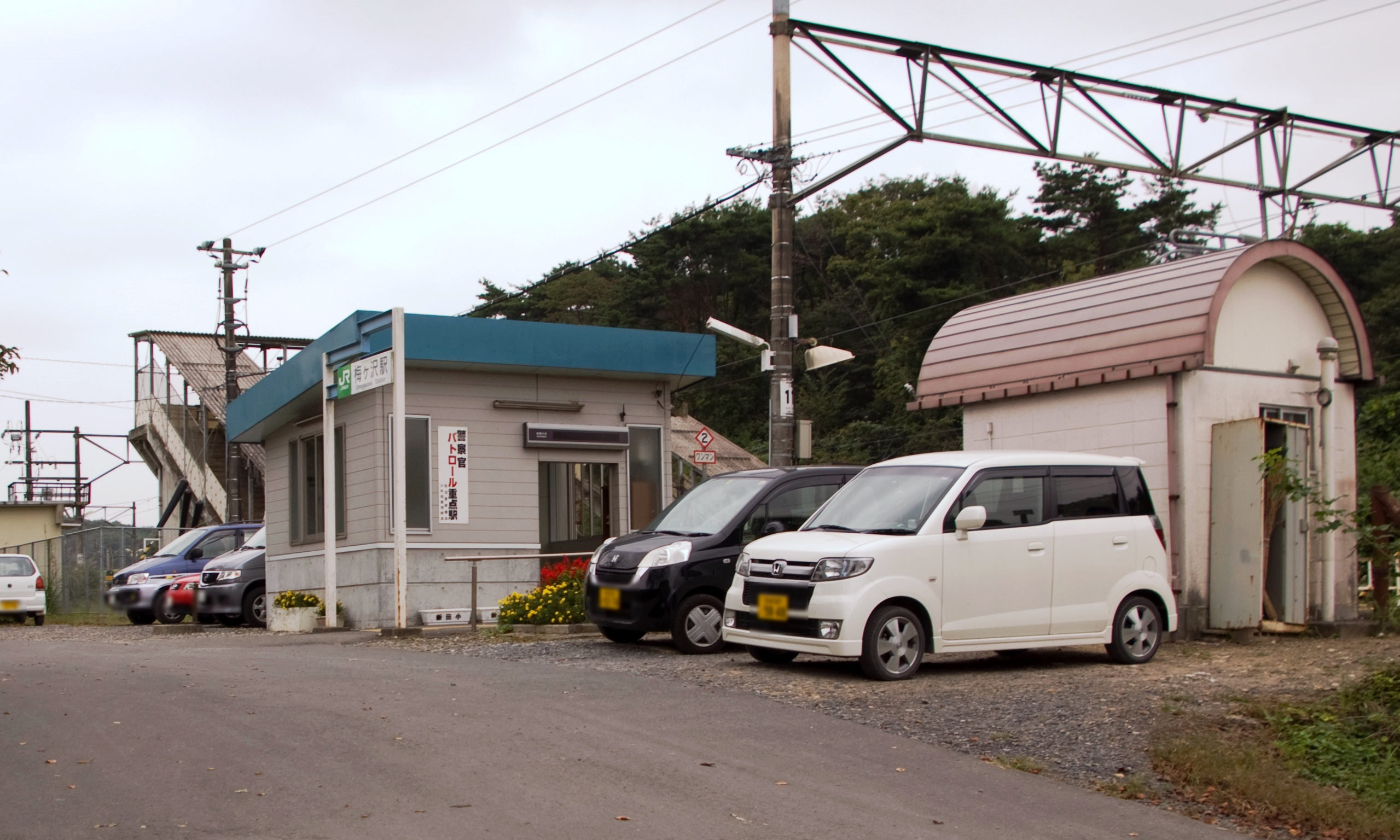
- Umegasawa Station, June 2010

General information
- Location: 53 Sotosawada, Hasama-cho Nitta, Tome-shi, Miyagi-ken 989-4601; Japan
- Coordinates: 38.6815°N 141.0854°E
- Operator: JR East
- Line: ■ Tōhoku Main Line
- Distance: 411.5 km from Tokyo
- Platforms: 2 side platforms
- Tracks: 2

Construction
- Structure type: At grade

Other information
- Status: Unattended
- Website: Official website

History
- Opened: March 2, 1953

Services
Preceding station	JR East	Following station
Semine towards Kuroiso	Tōhoku Main Line Local	Nitta towards Morioka
Location
- Location within Miyagi Prefecture Location within Japan

Umegasawa Station (梅ヶ沢駅, Umegasawa-eki) is a railway station in the city of Tome, Miyagi Prefecture, Japan, operated by East Japan Railway Company (JR East).

== Lines ==
Umegasawa Station is served by the Tōhoku Main Line, and is located 411.5 rail kilometers from the official starting point of the line at Tokyo Station.

== Station layout ==
Umegasawa Station has two opposed side platforms connected to the station building by on overhead passageway. The station is unattended.

=== Platforms ===
1	■ Tōhoku Main Line	for Kogota and Sendai
2	■ Tōhoku Main Line	for Hanaizumi and Ichinoseki

== History ==
Umegasawa Station opened on March 2, 1953. The station was absorbed into the JR East network upon the privatization of the Japanese National Railways (JNR) on April 1, 1987.

== See also ==
- List of railway stations in Japan
