= Nitta Station (Miyagi) =

Railway station in Tome, Miyagi Prefecture, Japan

Nitta Station 新田駅
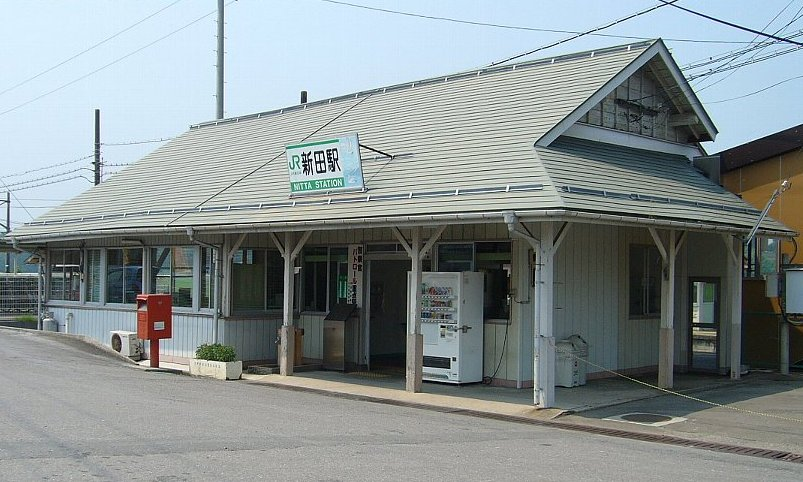
- Nitta Station, August 2006

General information
- Location: Hasama-cho Nitta, Tome-shi, Miyagi-ken 989-4601; Japan
- Coordinates: 38°42′41″N 141°07′11″E
- Operator: JR East
- Line: ■ Tōhoku Main Line
- Distance: 416.2 km from Tokyo
- Platforms: 1 side + 1 island platform
- Tracks: 3

Construction
- Structure type: At grade

Other information
- Status: Unstaffed
- Website: Official website

History
- Opened: January 4, 1894

Passengers
- FY2017: 244 daily

Services
| Preceding station | JR East | Following station |
|---|---|---|
| Umegasawa towards Kuroiso | Tōhoku Main Line Local | Ishikoshi towards Morioka |
Location
- Location within Miyagi Prefecture Location within Japan

Nitta Station (新田駅, Nitta-eki) is a railway station in the city of Tome, Miyagi Prefecture, Japan, operated by East Japan Railway Company (JR East).

== Lines ==
Nitta Station is served by the Tōhoku Main Line, and is located 416.2 rail kilometers from the official starting point of the line at Tokyo Station.

== Station layout ==
Nitta Station has one island platform and one side platforms connected to the station building by a footbridge; however track 2 of the island platform is not in use. The station is unattended.

=== Platforms ===
| 1 | ■ Tōhoku Main Line | for Kogota and Sendai |
| 2 | ■ Tōhoku Main Line | Not in use |
| 3 | ■ Tōhoku Main Line | for Ishikoshi and Ichinoseki |

== History ==
Nitta Station opened on January 4, 1894. The station was absorbed into the JR East network upon the privatization of the Japanese National Railways (JNR) on April 1, 1987.

== Passenger statistics ==
In fiscal 2017, the station was used by an average of 244 passengers daily (boarding passengers only).

== Surrounding area ==
- National Route 398
- Tome City Hall

== See also ==
- List of railway stations in Japan
