= Kurihara Den'en Railway Line =

Former railway line in Miyagi Prefecture, Japan

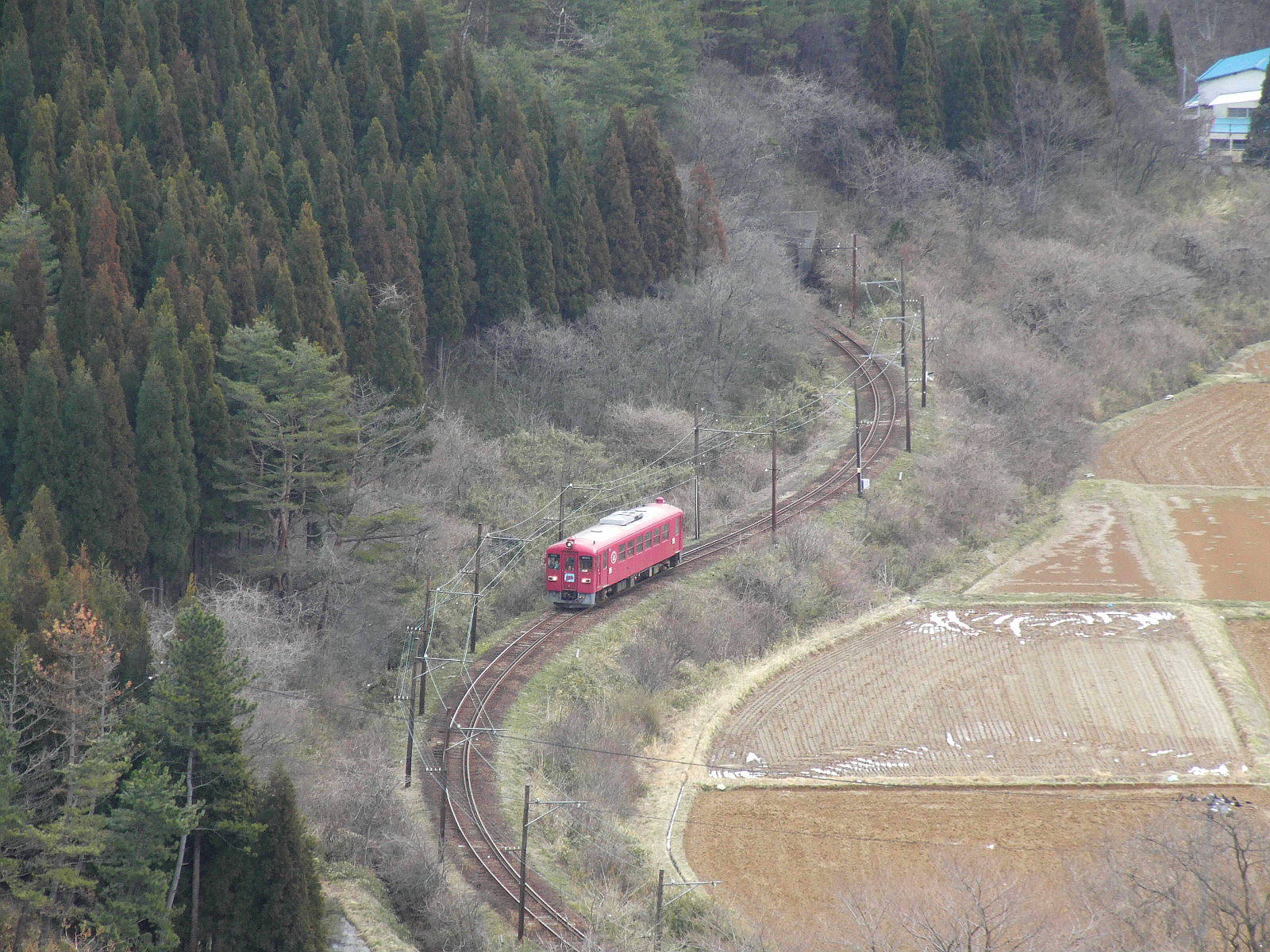
- Near Hosokura Mine Park Mae in 2006

Overview
- Status: closed
- Termini: 1921; 104 years ago; March 2007; 18 years ago

Technical
- Line length: 25.7 km (16.0 mi)
- Track gauge: 1,067 mm (3 ft 6 in)

The Kurihara Den'en Railway Line (くりはら田園鉄道線, Kurihara Den'en Tetsudō sen) was a rural rail line in Miyagi Prefecture, Japan, abandoned on March 31, 2007. Running from Ishikoshi Station in Tome, Miyagi with a connection to the Tōhoku Main Line, extending westward to inland Hosokura Mine Park Mae Station in Kurihara, along central Kurihara. This line used to be called Kuriden (栗電 or くりでん) for short because the preceding name of the operator was the Kurihara Electric Railway (栗原電鉄, Kurihara Dentetsu).

The line was initially constructed to transport ore from Uguisuzawa's Hosokura Mine (細倉鉱山, Hosokura Kōzan) which was closed in 1988.

== Infrastructure ==
The operator introduced diesel multiple units (DMU) during the reorganization in 1995, but the old 750 V DC electric installation remained for economic reasons. It was one of few railways then in Japan that operated with an obsolete semaphore signal system and non-automatic blocking system.

== Operation and service ==
All trains consisted of a single car without a conductor. The fare was twice as high as comparable distances on Japan Railways lines. Only three of the sixteen stations, namely Wakayanagi, Sawabe, Kurikoma were regularly staffed.

== History ==
Originally the line was 762 mm (2 ft 6 in) gauged, constructed by Kurihara Tramway (栗原軌道, Kurihara Kidō) and opened in 1921, later renamed to Kurihara Railway (栗原鉄道, Kurihara Tetsudō) in 1941 and again to Kurihara Dentetsu in 1955.

The closure of Hosokura Mine in 1988 reduced freight traffic. The company had hoped for tourists to the Hosokura Mine Park, an amusement park built at the mine site. But this effort failed to stop the decrease of passengers. Municipalities decided to retain the operator as a third sector (in Japanese sense) in 1993, renamed on April 1, 1995 to Kurihara Den'en Railway.

The company has curtailed investment and maintenance measures and made some efforts to increase passengers. But the rapid shift to car traffic has overwhelmed railways everywhere in Japan since the 1990s. Miyagi Prefecture had subsidized the deficit for several years, but in 2001 gave notice to the municipalities of a future suspension of the subsidy. In December 2003 they decided to close the railway in March 2007.

== Timeline ==
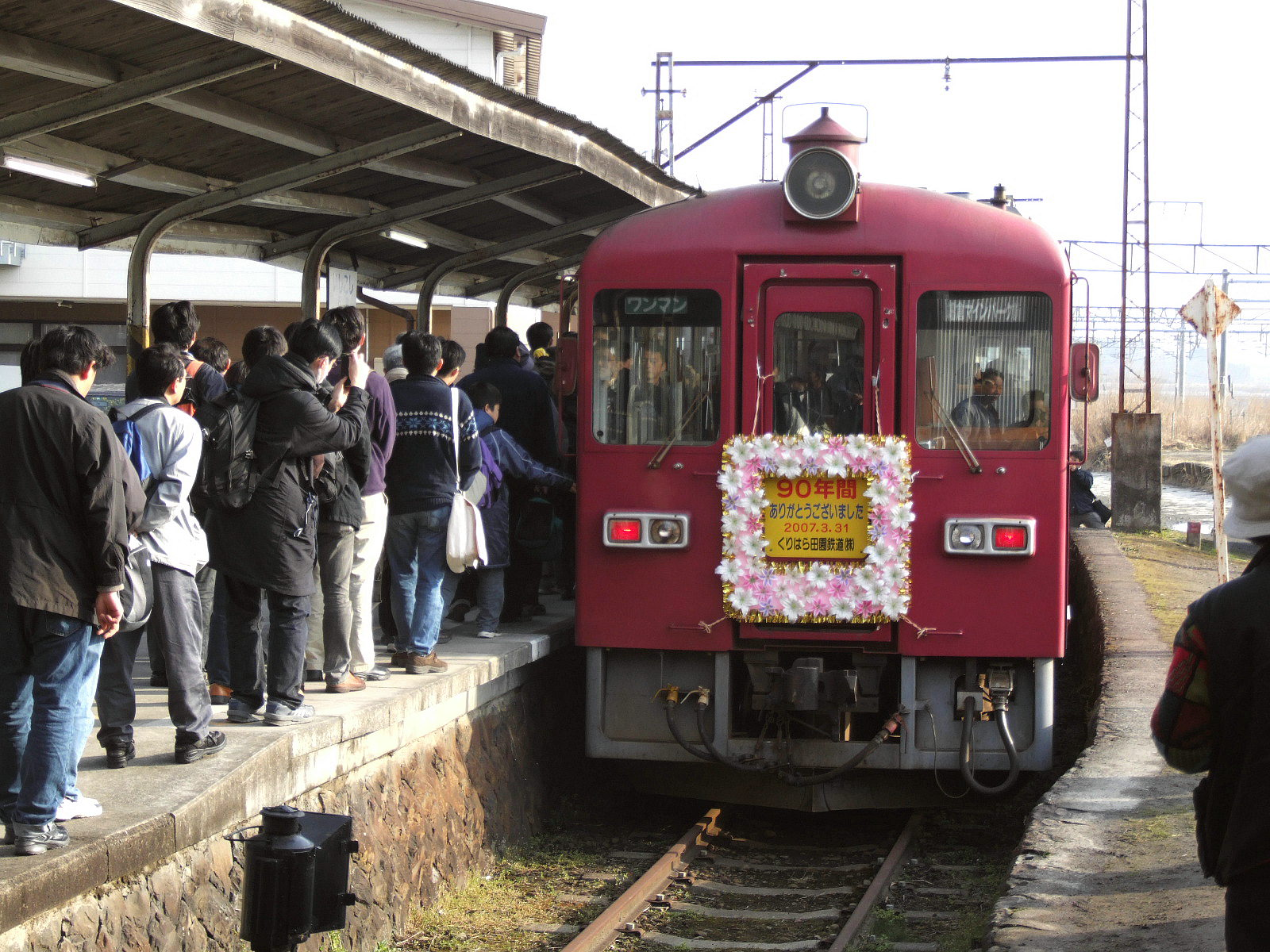
On the last day in 2007

- December 15, 1918: Kurihara Tramway (栗原軌道, Kurihara Kidō) established
- December 20, 1921: Ishikoshi - Sawabe (8.85 km or 5.50 mi)
- December 17, 1922: Sawabe - Iwasasaki (later Kurikoma) (7.73 km or 4.80 mi)
- December 3, 1941: Classification from tramway to railway, renamed to Kurihara Railway (栗原鉄道, Kurihara Tetsudō)
- December 1, 1942: Iwasasaki - Hosokura Mine (ca. 9.62 km or 5.98 mi), 26.2 km (16.3 mi) stretch completed
- September 21, 1952: Electrified DC 750 V
- September 26, 1955: Regauged from 762 mm (2 ft 6 in) to 1,067 mm (3 ft 6 in) for through operation to the then Japanese National Railways
- November 29, 1955: Renamed to Kurihara Electric Railway (栗原電鉄, Kurihara Dentetsu)
- June 1, 1964: Bus and train services in the area combined to a single company, Miyagi Chūō Kōtsū (宮城中央交通)
- August 31, 1968: Bus service separated to Miyagi Central Bus (宮城中央バス, Miyagi Chūō Bus)
- February 25, 1969: Renamed back again to Kurihara Electric Railway
- March 29, 1987: Hosokuura - Hosokuura Mine freight service closed
- November 1, 1988: Hosokura - Hosokura Mine (0.8 km or 0.50 mi) abandoned (in some source on October 27)
- June 16, 1990: Hosokura - Hosokura Mine Park Mae (0.2 km or 0.12 mi) opened. Hosokura Station abandoned
- December 15, 1993: Mitsubishi Material transferred ownership of the Kurihara Electric Railway to the then five towns (in 2007, 2 cities) along the line
- May 1, 1995: Renamed to Kurihara Den'en Railway. Electric operation terminated. Conductorless operation introduced
- April 1, 2007: Railway service terminated

== Stations ==
Station names and location use the name at the time of line closure. All stations were located in Miyagi Prefecture.

Station	Japanese	Open	Close	Notes	Location
Ishikoshi	石越	December 20, 1921	April 1, 2007	Connection with Tohoku Main Line	Tome
Aramachi	荒町	December 20, 1921	April 1, 2007		Kurihara
Wakayanagi	若柳	December 20, 1921	April 1, 2007		Kurihara
Yachihata	谷地畑	October 10, 1926	April 1, 2007		Kurihara
Ōokashōmae	大岡小前	December 25, 1995	April 1, 2007		Kurihara
Ōoka	大岡	December 20, 1921	April 1, 2007		Kurihara
Sawabe	沢辺	December 20, 1921	April 1, 2007		Kurihara
Tsukumo	津久毛	January 15, 1924	April 1, 2007		Kurihara
Sugihashi	杉橋	January 15, 1924	April 1, 2007		Kurihara
Toyasaki	鳥矢崎	February 13, 1930	April 1, 2007		Kurihara
Kurikoma	栗駒	December 17, 1922	April 1, 2007		Kurihara
Kuriharatamachi	栗原田町	November 1, 1951	April 1, 2007		Kurihara
Omatsu	尾松	December 1, 1942	April 1, 2007		Kurihara
Uguisuzawa	鴬沢	December 1, 1942	April 1, 2007		Kurihara
Uguisuzawa Kōgyōkōkō Mae	鶯沢工業高校前	April 1, 1952	April 1, 2007		Kurihara
Hosokura Mine Park Mae	細倉マインパーク前	December 1, 1942	April 1, 2007	Relocated by 200m in 1990 and renamed from "Hosokura"	Kurihara

== Rolling stock ==
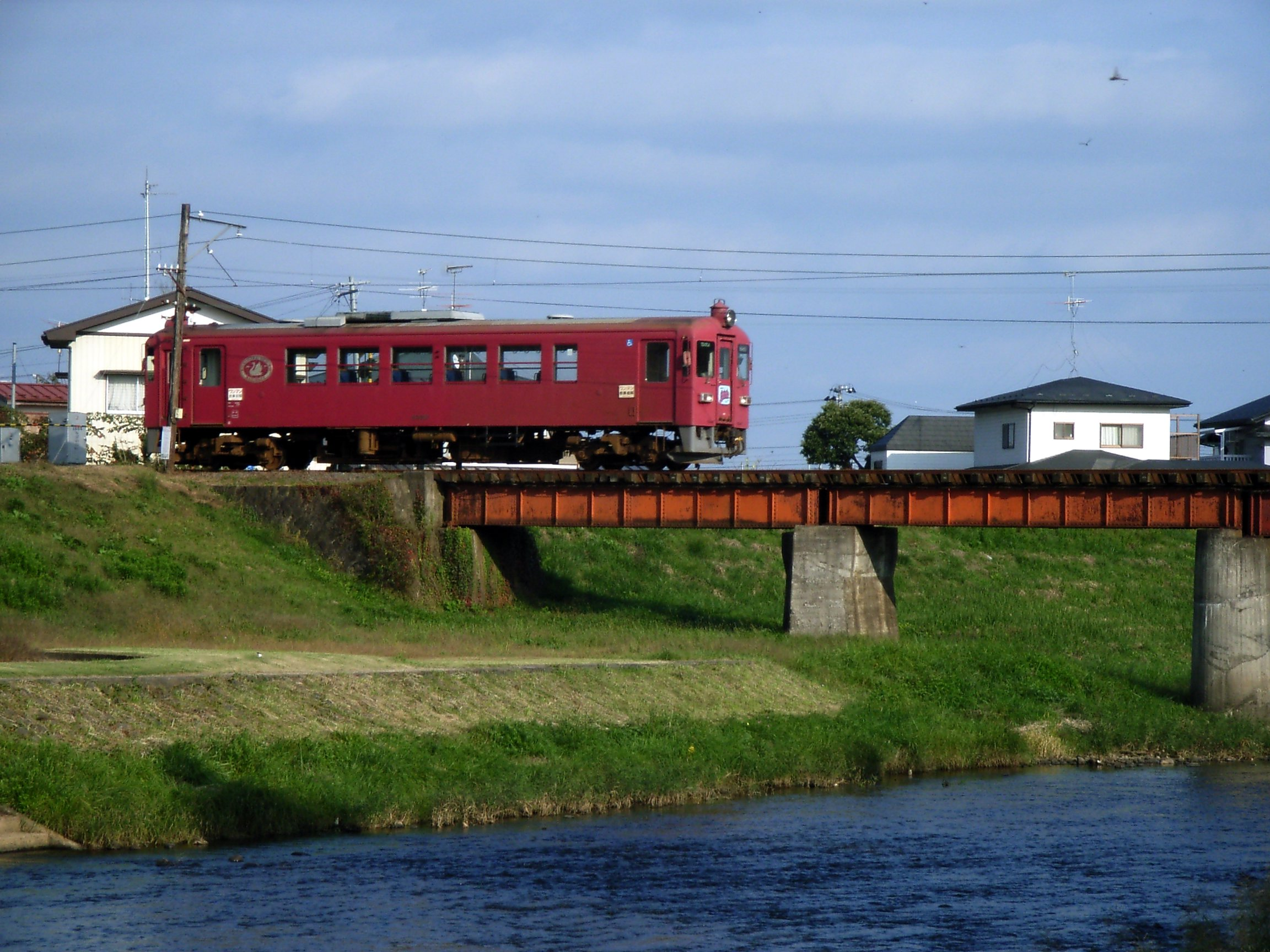
KD 95 type

- For service
  KD 95 type
  Railcar (DMU) built in 1995. Nos. KD 951 to KD 953
  KD 10 type
  Railcar (DMU) for busy hours, used with conductor. Nos. KD 11, KD 12, previously Nagoya Railroad "Kiha 10" type, nos. "Kiha 15", "Kiha 16"
- For maintenance
  DB 10 type
  Diesel locomotive, 4-wheel. No. DB 101
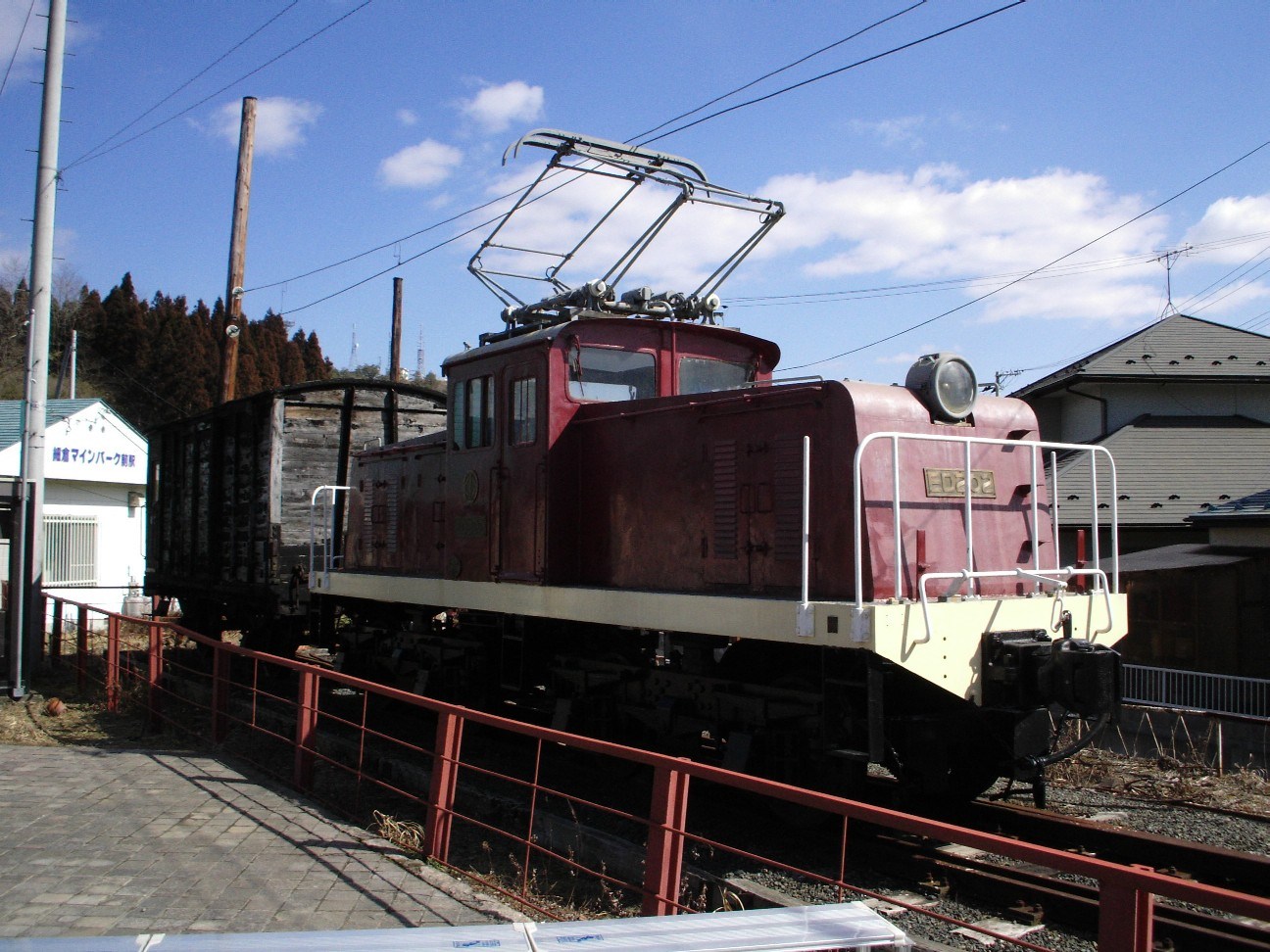
  ED202 type
  MC 100 type
  Motor car
  No. "To 102", "To 103"
  Wooden truck (gondola)
  No. "Wafu 74"
  Wooden wagon
- Preserved from electrified period, at Kurihara Mine Park Mae
  ED202
  Electric locomotive, 2-truck, 8-wheel. Regauged survivour of 762 mm (2 ft 6 in) era
  No. "Wa 71"
  Wooden wagon
- Left intact in Wakayanagi depot
  EMUs used until 1995
  M15 type, newly built on regaugement, etc.
