= Wakayanagi Station =

Former railway station in Kurihara, Miyagi Prefecture, Japan

Coordinates: 38°46′30″N 141°07′56″E

Wakayanagi Station 若柳駅
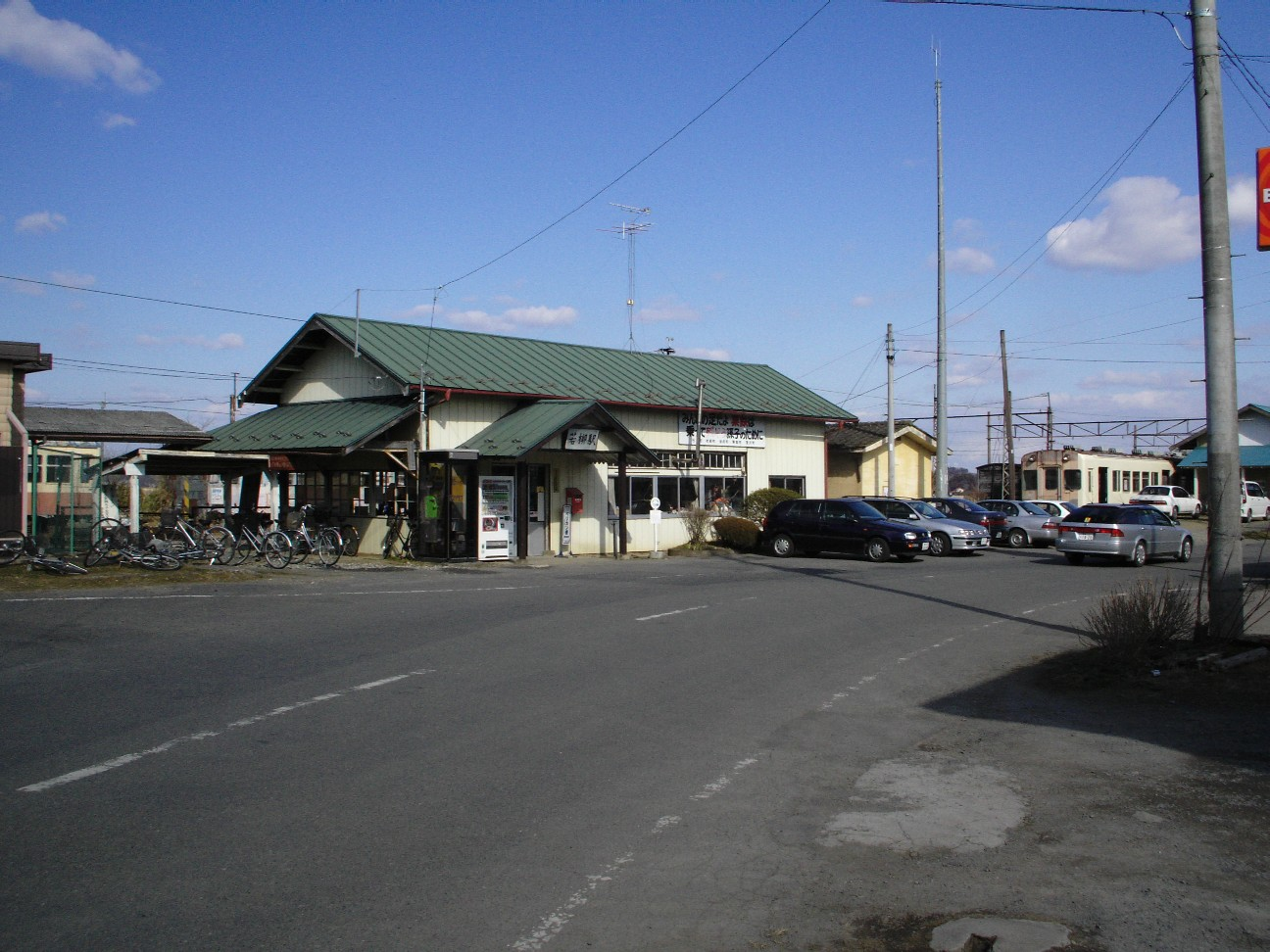
- The station building in February 2007

General information
- Location: Kurihara, Miyagi Prefecture; Japan
- Operator: Kurihara Den'en Railway Company
- Line: Kurihara Den'en Railway Line

Other information
- Status: Staffed

History
- Opened: 20 December 1921; 104 years ago
- Closed: 1 April 2007; 19 years ago
Location

Wakayanagi Station (若柳駅, Wakayanagi-eki) was a station located on the Kurihara Den'en Railway Company Kurihara Den'en Railway Line in Kurihara, Miyagi Prefecture, Japan.

== Description ==
The station is built on the surface, with the rail running between east and west. The station building was located south of the rails. The station had two platforms, a side platform and an island platform, and three tracks between the platforms and both sides of the island platform. However, by the line's last years, only the side platform closer to the station building was in use. The station building was made of wood, is similar to Sawabe Station.

The station opened on 20 December 1921, and closed upon the closure of the line on 1 April 2007. The station is now reopened as a museum on 1 April 2017 and preserved, becoming the only station preserved in the line.
