= Ishikoshi Station =

Railway station in Tome, Miyagi Prefecture, Japan

Ishikoshi Station 石越駅
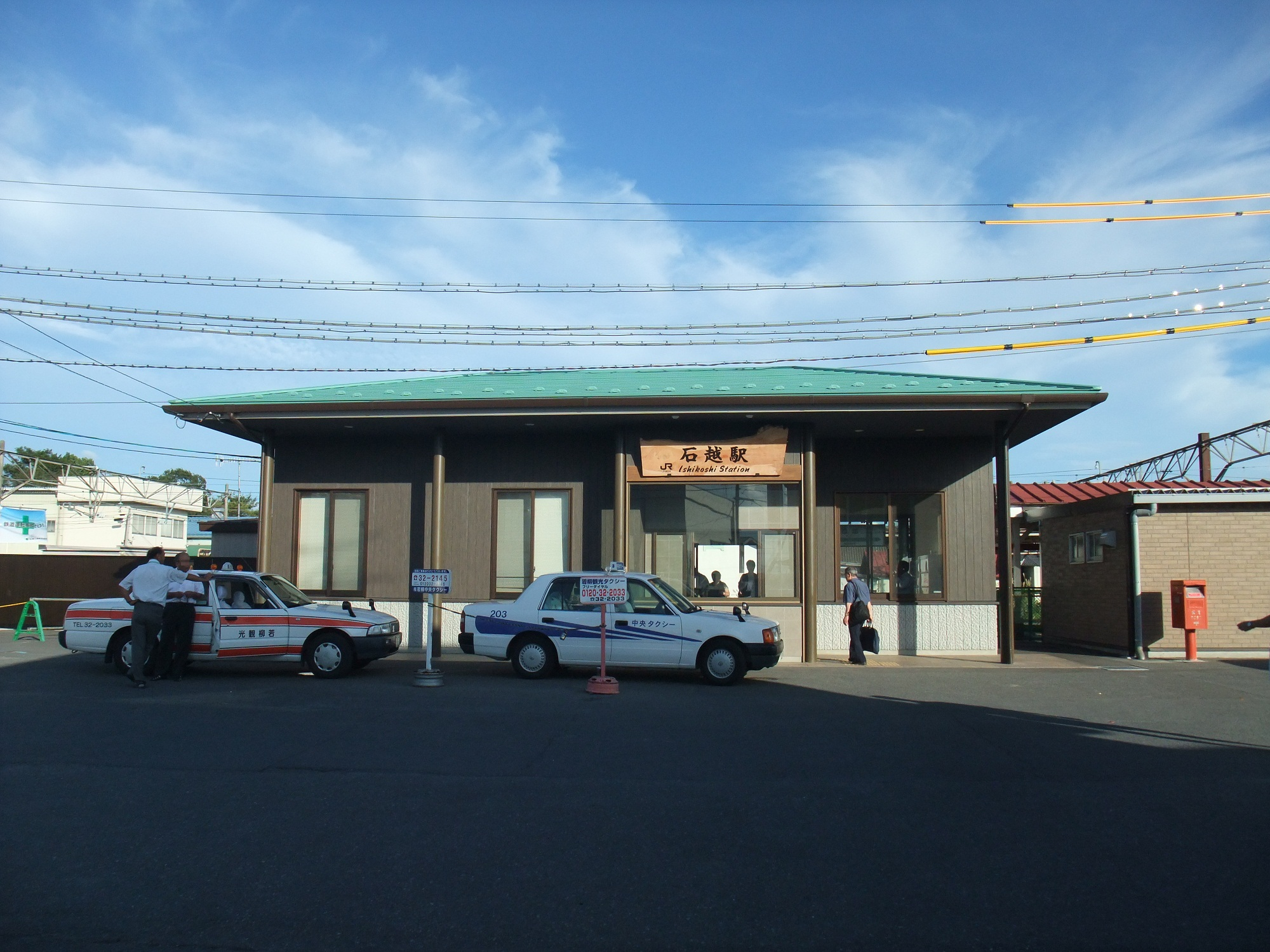
- Ishikoshi Station, September 2012

General information
- Location: Nishimikado-oki, Nango, Ichikoshi-cho, Tome-shi, Miyagi-ken 989-4703; Japan
- Coordinates: 38°46′08″N 141°09′33″E
- Operator: JR East
- Line: ■ Tōhoku Main Line
- Distance: 423.5 km from Tokyo
- Platforms: 1 side + 1 island platform
- Tracks: 3

Construction
- Structure type: At grade

Other information
- Status: Unstaffed (Automatic ticket vending machines available)
- Website: Official website

History
- Opened: 16 April 1890; 136 years ago

Passengers
- FY2018: 306 daily

Services
Preceding station	JR East	Following station
Nitta towards Kuroiso	Tōhoku Main Line Local	Yushima towards Morioka
Location
- Location within Miyagi Prefecture Location within Japan

Ishikoshi Station (石越駅, Ishikoshi-eki) is a railway station in the city of Tome, Miyagi Prefecture, Japan, operated by East Japan Railway Company (JR East).

== Lines ==
Ishikoshi Station is served by the Tōhoku Main Line, and is located 423.5 rail kilometers from the official starting point of the line at Tokyo Station.

== Station layout ==
Ishikoshi Station has one island platform and one side platform connected to the station building by a footbridge. The station is unstaffed but has automatic ticket vending machines.

=== Platforms ===
1	■ Tōhoku Main Line	for Hanaizumi and Ichinoseki
2	■ Tōhoku Main Line	for starting trains in both directions
3	■ Tōhoku Main Line	for Kogota and Sendai

== History ==
Ishikoshi Station opened on 16 April 1890. The Kurihara Den'en Railway Line also served this station from 1921 to 2007. The station was absorbed into the JR East network upon the privatization of the Japanese National Railways (JNR) on 1 April 1987. A new station building was completed on 31 July 2011.. Ishikoshi station is the terminus for the Tōhoku Main Line in Miyagi. Trains to Iwate are available but must be changed to at the station.

== Passenger statistics ==
In fiscal 2018, the station was used by an average of 306 passengers daily (boarding passengers only).

== Surrounding area ==
- Ishikoshi Post Office
- former Ishikoshi Town Hall

== See also ==
- List of railway stations in Japan
