= Accum =

Accum may refer to:

- Friedrich Accum (1769–1838), a German chemist who worked mostly in England
- The Japanese EV-E301 series and EV-E801 series trains, branded "Accum"
- Accum, Lower Saxony; see List of windmills in Lower Saxony
