= E801 =

E801 may refer to:

- European route E801
- EV-E801 series
