= BEC819 series =

Japanese battery electric multiple unit train type

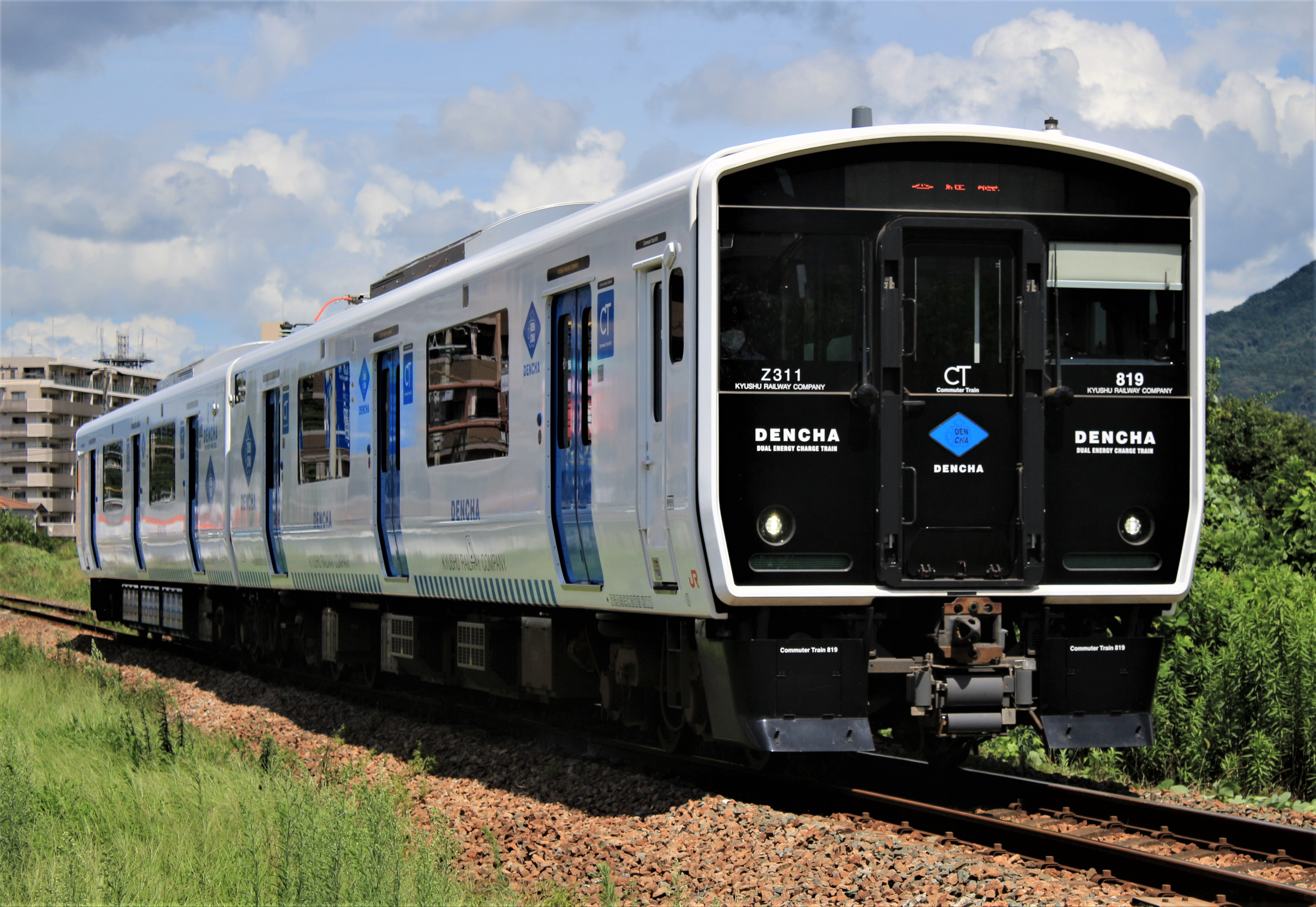
- BEC819 series in July 2020
- Manufacturer: Hitachi Rail
- Designer: Eiji Mitooka
- Built at: Kudamatsu, Yamaguchi
- Family name: A-train
- Constructed: 2016–
- Entered service: 19 October 2016
- Number built: 36 vehicles (18 sets)
- Number in service: 36 vehicles (18 sets)
- Formation: 2 cars per trainset
- Fleet numbers: Z001–Z007 (series 0); other (series 300)
- Operator: JR Kyushu
- Depot: Nogata Depot
- Lines served: Fukuhoku Yutaka Line; Chikuhō Main Line; Kashii Line

Specifications
- Car body construction: Aluminium alloy
- Train length: 40,000 mm (131 ft 3 in)
- Car length: 20,000 mm (65 ft 7 in)
- Width: 2,950 mm (9 ft 8 in)
- Height: 3,980 mm (13 ft 1 in) (4,096 mm (13 ft 5 in) with pantograph raised)
- Floor height: 1,125 mm (3 ft 8 in)
- Doors: 3 pairs per side
- Maximum speed: 120 km/h (75 mph)
- Traction system: IGBT–VVVF
- Traction motors: 4 × MT404K 95 kW (127 hp) 3-phase AC induction motor
- Power output: 380 kW (510 hp)
- Electric systems: 20 kV 60 Hz AC (overhead catenary); 1,598 V DC (li-ion battery)
- Current collection: Pantograph
- Bogies: DT409K (powered); TR409K (trailer)
- Safety system: ATS-DK
- Track gauge: 1,067 mm (3 ft 6 in)

Notes/references
- This train won the 60th Blue Ribbon Award in 2017.

The BEC819 series (BEC819系), branded "DENCHA" (Dual Energy Charge Train), is a two-car bi-modal electric multiple unit (BEMU) train operated by Kyushu Railway Company (JR Kyushu) on inter-running services over the Fukuhoku Yutaka Line and Chikuhō Main Line in Fukuoka Prefecture in northern Kyushu, Japan, since October 2016, and also on the Kashii Line.

== Background ==
The JNR KiHa 40 series, based on Diesel Multiple Unit (DMU), were run by JR Kyushu's non-electrified railway system areas of which, a section within city yet comparably short-distance's railtracks. JR Kyushu aimed to replace the KiHa 40 series which lead to the creation of the BEC 819 series. Chikuhō Main Line (the Wakamatsu Line) were the first of the railines to implement this series. This was due to Chikuhō Main Line being considered suitable in terms of "route length for battery capacity that could be installed for battery-powered operation," and also because the Kitakyushu City aims to become a "World Environmental Capital," leading to the introduction on the Wakamatsu Line, which runs within the city. The modified prototype cars, converted from the 817 series—the world's first battery electric train operating under an AC electrification system— the train was produced as a practical, mass-production vehicle. Although the car body and passenger facilities are based on the 817–200 series, feedback from the 305 series cars have been incorporated.

In November, 2014 (Heisei Year 26), JR Kyushu publicly announced placing BEC 819 series into service.

On 29 January 2016 (Heisei Year 28), they announced details. The task of cars's paint and interior designs were going to be handled by Eiji Mitooka (水戸岡鋭治), who which were responsible for many JR Kyushu trains. (see #Design)

On 24 May 2017 (Heisei Year 29), they received the 60th Blue Ribbon Award from the Japanese Railfan club (鉄道友の会).

As a derivative variant, East Japan Railway Company (JR East) introduced the EV-E801 series, based on thus series with adaptation for cold and snow resistance.

=== Feedback from Battery-powered test trains ===
From 2012 (Heisei Year 24) to 2013 (Heisei Year 25), there were testing conducted on a modified 817-1000 series train and the following were identified:

1. As a modified train based on existing EMU, there were not enough space given under-floor which houses main circuit batteries, resulting in insufficient battery capacity.
2. If the pantograph folding height were the same as that of a conventional electric train, there were risk of interference with narrow tunnels located on non-electrified sections.
3. The interior lighting would momentary lose power when switching between the drive mode for electrified and non-electrified.
4. During a non-electrified section, there is a risk of accidentally leaving the pantograph up and continue creating danger of collision.

Whilst resolving the issues, the designing of this series begain, and running tests were carried out with pre-production mass-produced vehicles.

== Design ==
Based on the earlier 817 series electric multiple unit (EMU) trains, styling of the trains was overseen by industrial designer Eiji Mitooka.

The lithium-ion battery system used has a capacity of 360 kWh and operates at 1,598 V.

== Operations ==
The BEC819 series trains are used on through services over the Fukuhoku Yutaka Line electrified at 20 kV 60 Hz AC and the non-electrified Chikuhō Main Line (known as the "Wakamatsu Line") between Orio and Wakamatsu.

Since late 2018/early 2019, they are also used on the non-electrified Kashii Line.

These newer vehicles used on the Kashii Line belong to the "300" series (11 trainsets in total), while the slightly older ones used on the Wakamatsu Line are the "0" series (7 trainsets in total).

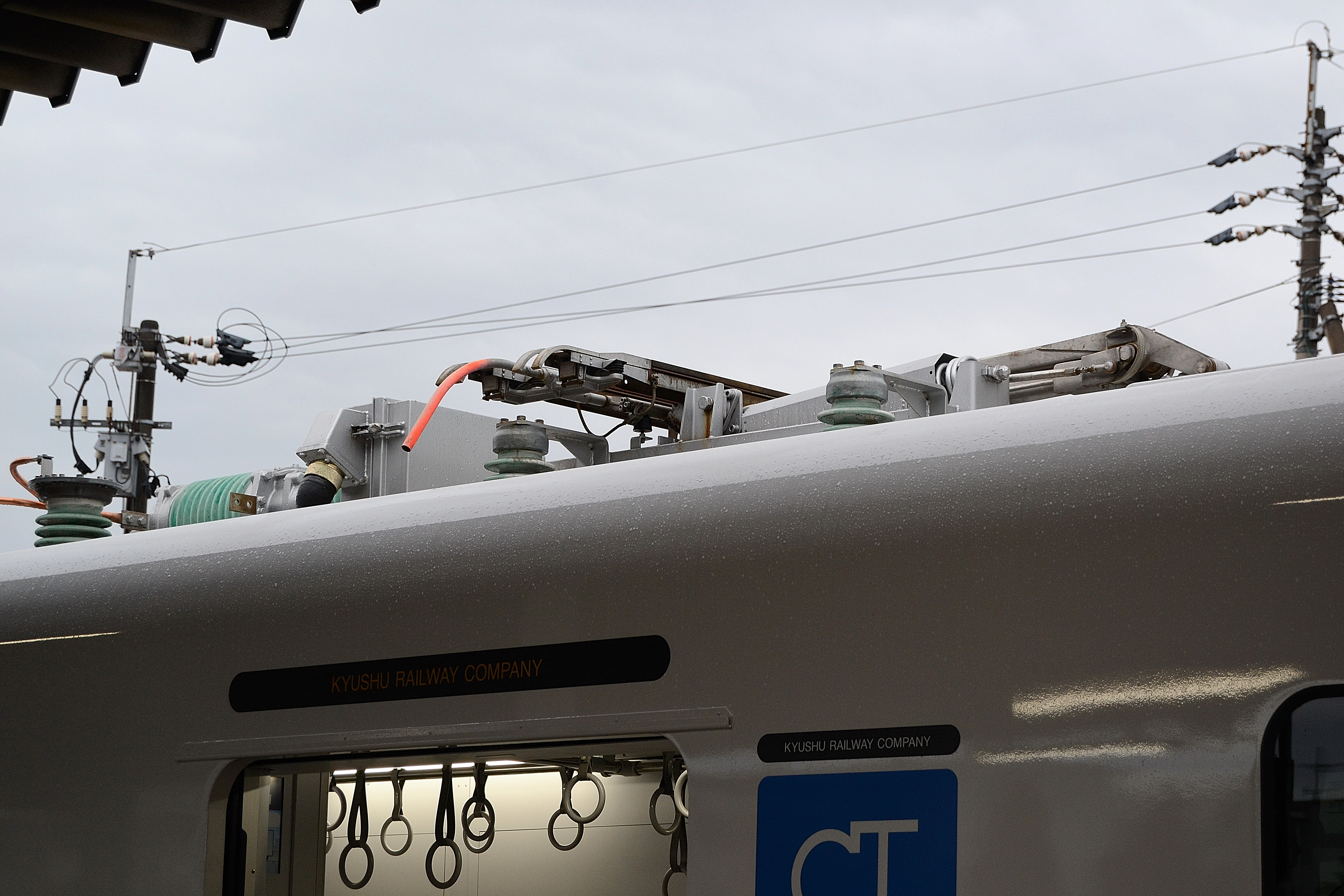
The pantograph lowered while at Wakamatsu Station on the non-electrified Wakamatsu Line in December 2016

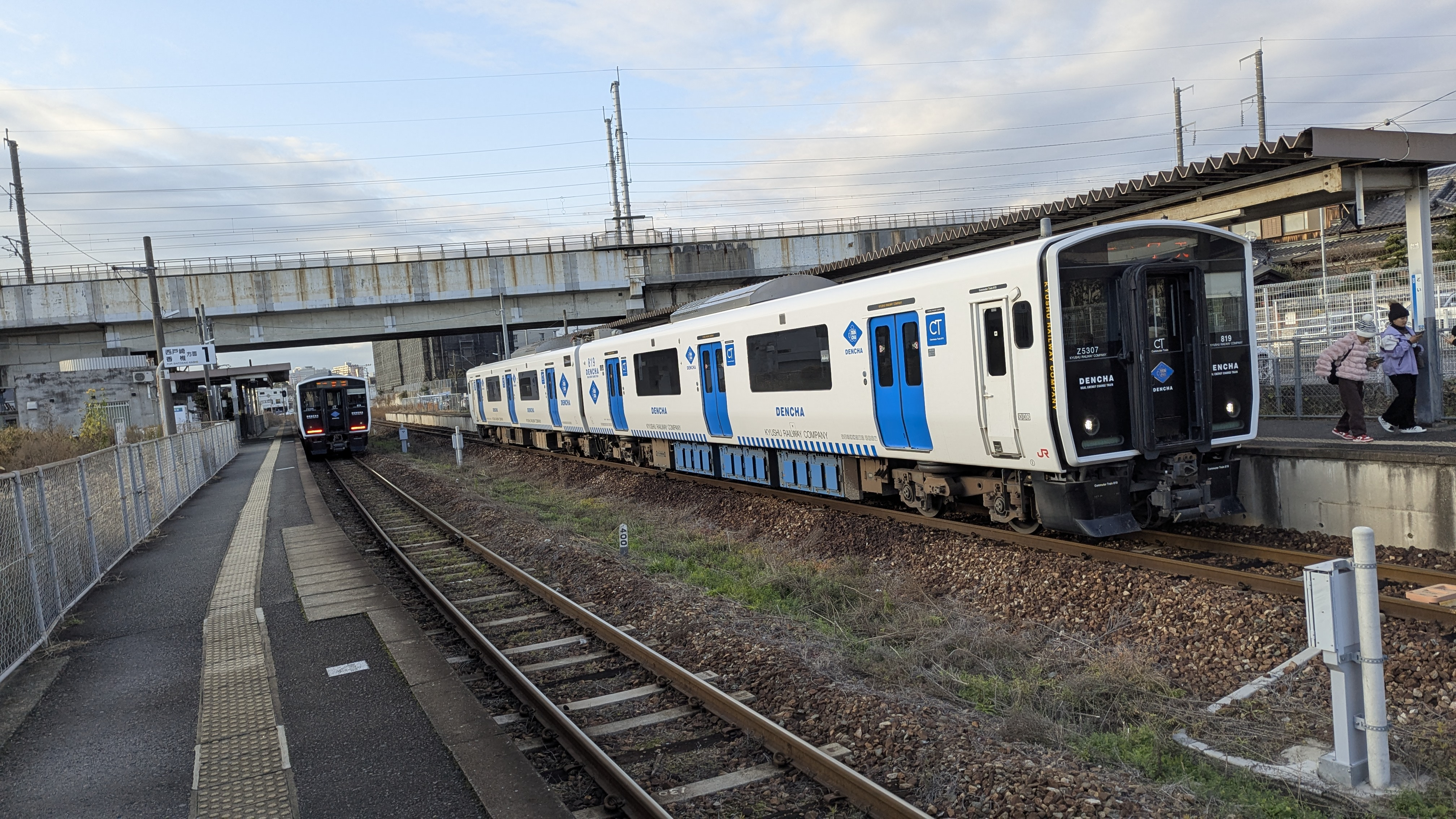
A photograph of BEC819 series in Doi Station (Fukuoka) with 2 trains on Kashii Line headed towards opposite sides, towards Umi Station (closest train; heading towards right of image) and presumably Kashii Station/Saitozaki Station.

== Formations ==
As of 8 June 2019, the fleet consists of eighteen two-car sets formed as follows, with one motorised ("Mc") car and one non-powered trailer ("TC") car.

Designation	Tc	Mc
Numbering	KuHa BEC818	KuMoHa BEC819
Weight (t)	35.5	36.6
Capacity (total/seated)	131/40	133/40

- The KuMoHa BEC819 car has one single-arm pantograph.
- The KuHa BEC818 car has a toilet at the inner end.

== Interior ==
Internally, LED lighting is used throughout.

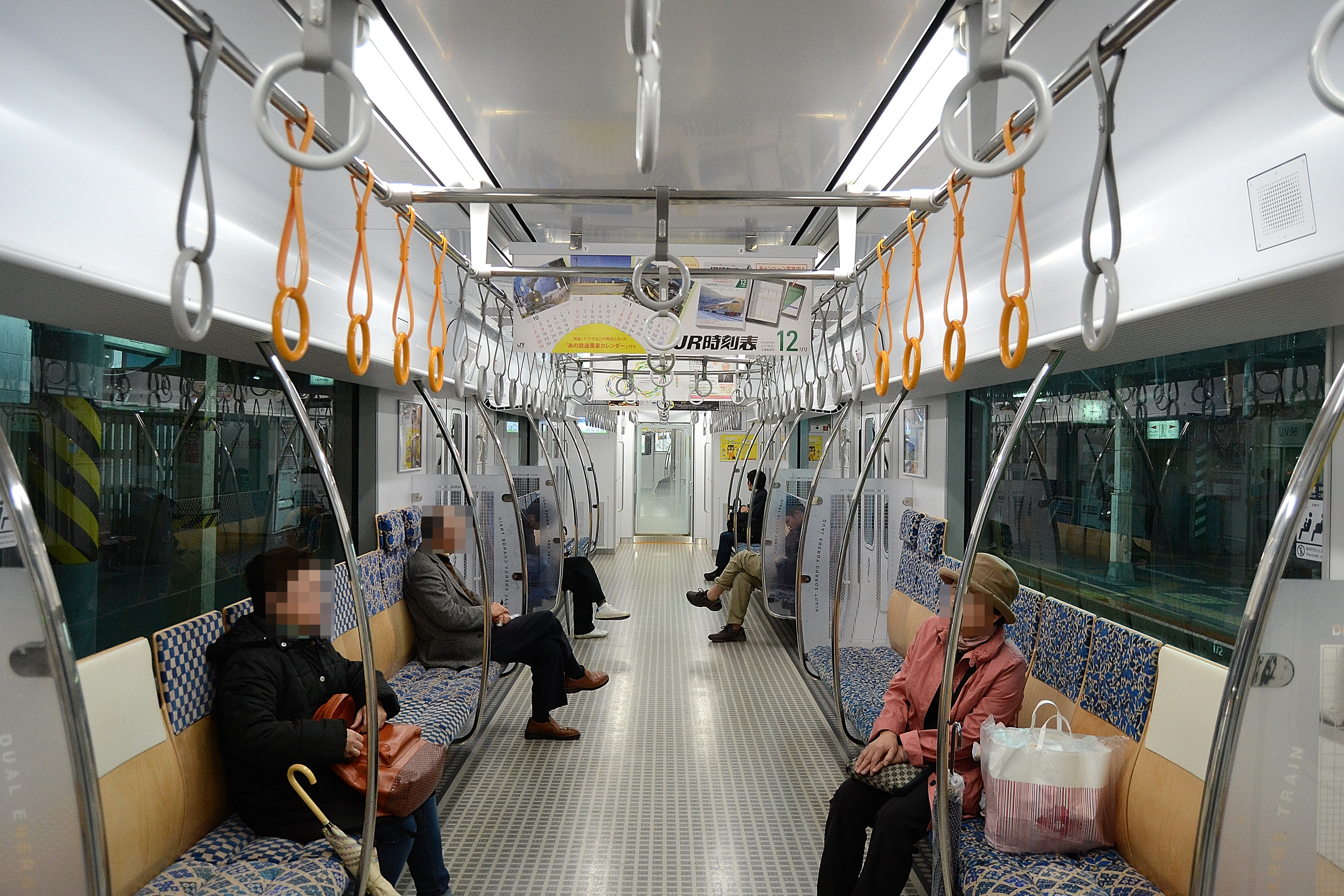
The interior of set Z001 in December 2016

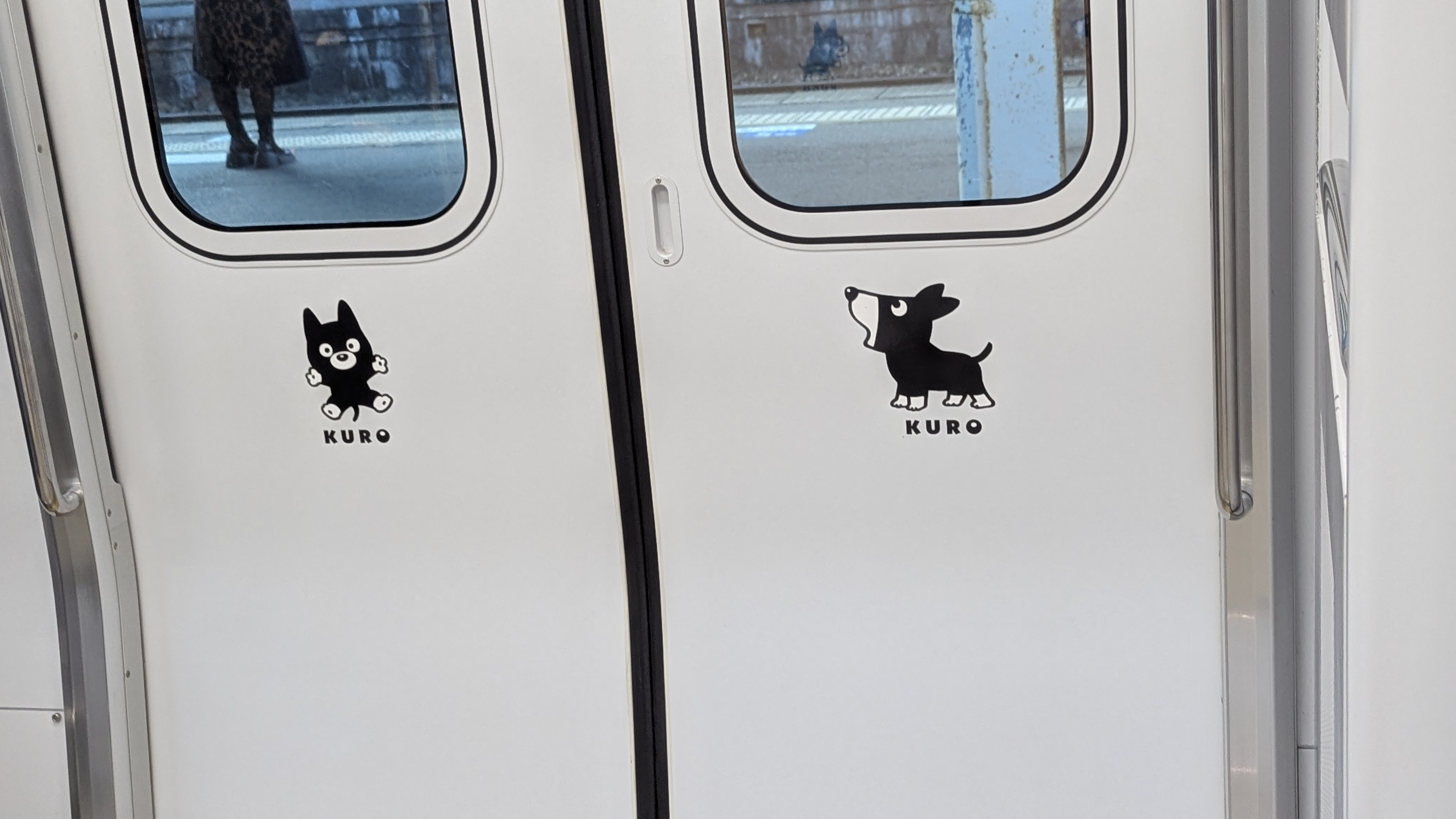
The mascot Kuro originally from the Asobo-i! express line, featured on the side doors of the BEC819 series train.

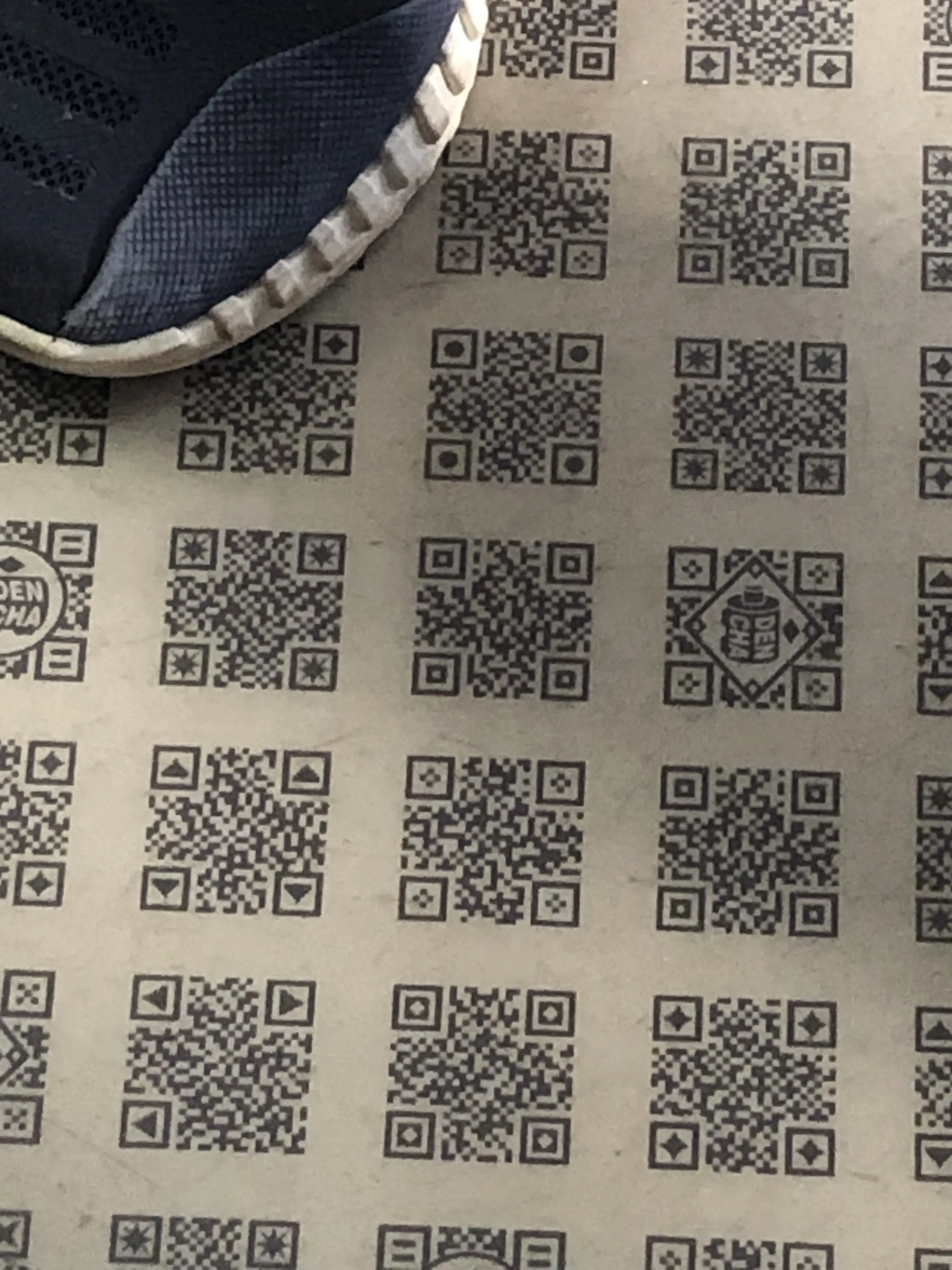
The unscannable QR codes, non-compliant with QR code standards, used as floor designs, sometimes featuring the DENCHA logo.

== History ==
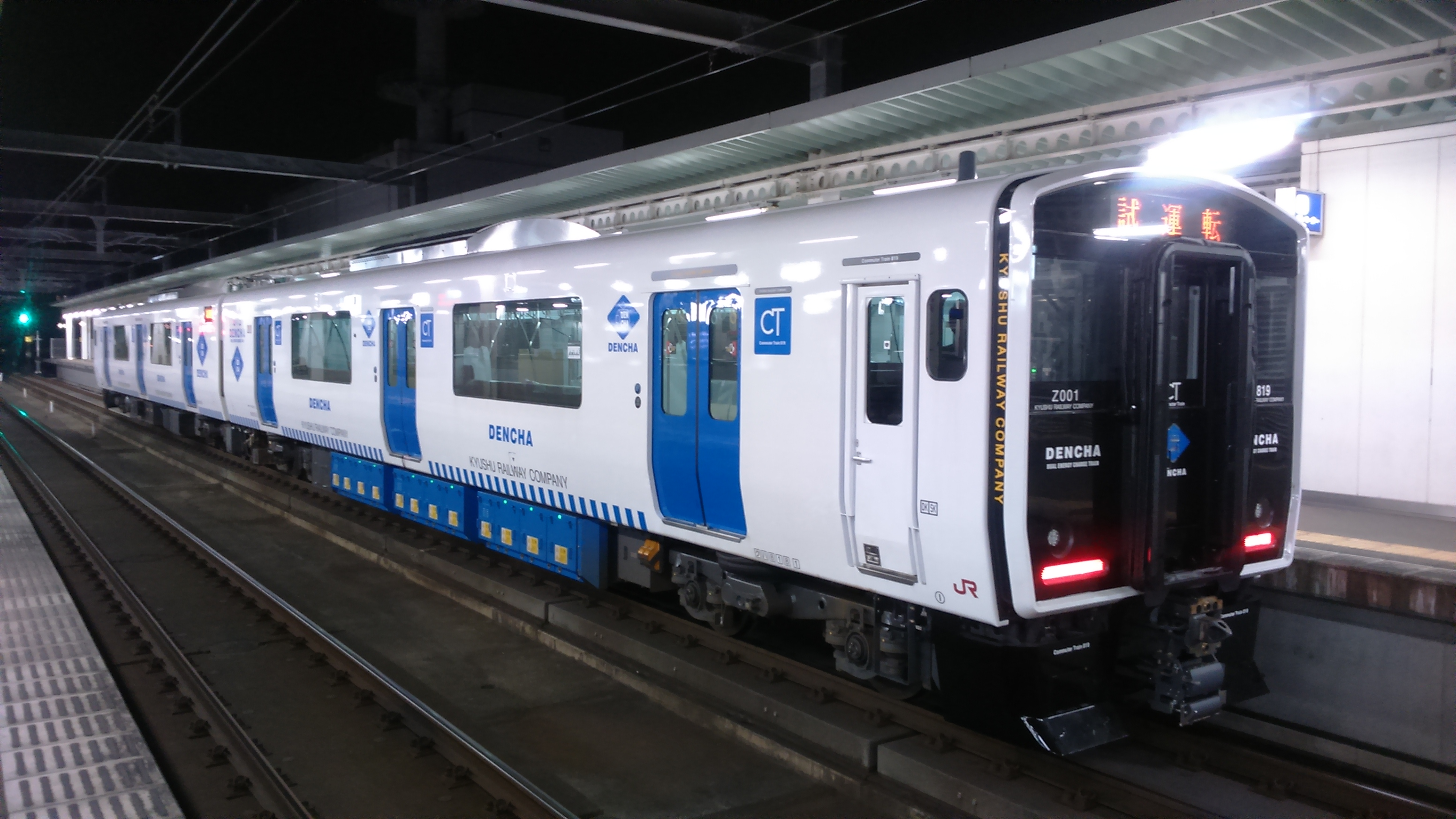
Set Z001 undergoing testing in June 2016

Initial details of the new train were formally announced by JR Kyushu on 29 January 2016. A pre-series two-car train was delivered from Hitachi's factory in Yamaguchi Prefecture in April 2016. This underwent testing before entering revenue-earning service on 19 October 2016. In May 2017, the BEC819 series was awarded the 2017 Blue Ribbon Award, presented annually by the Japan Railfan Club.

== Build histories ==
The individual build histories of the fleet are as follows.

Set No.	Manufacturer	Date delivered
Z001	Hitachi	12 May 2016
Z002	Hitachi	14 February 2017
Z003	Hitachi	14 February 2017
Z004	Hitachi	14 February 2017
Z005	Hitachi	25 February 2017
Z006	Hitachi	25 February 2017
Z007	Hitachi	25 February 2017

== See also ==
- Smart BEST, a self-charging BEMU train developed by Kinki Sharyo in 2012
- EV-E301 series, a DC BEMU introduced by JR East on the Karasuyama Line in 2014
- EV-E801 series, an AC BEMU introduced by JR East on the Oga Line in 2017
