= GS Yuasa =

Japanese battery company

GS Yuasa Corporation 株式会社ジーエス・ユアサ コーポレーション

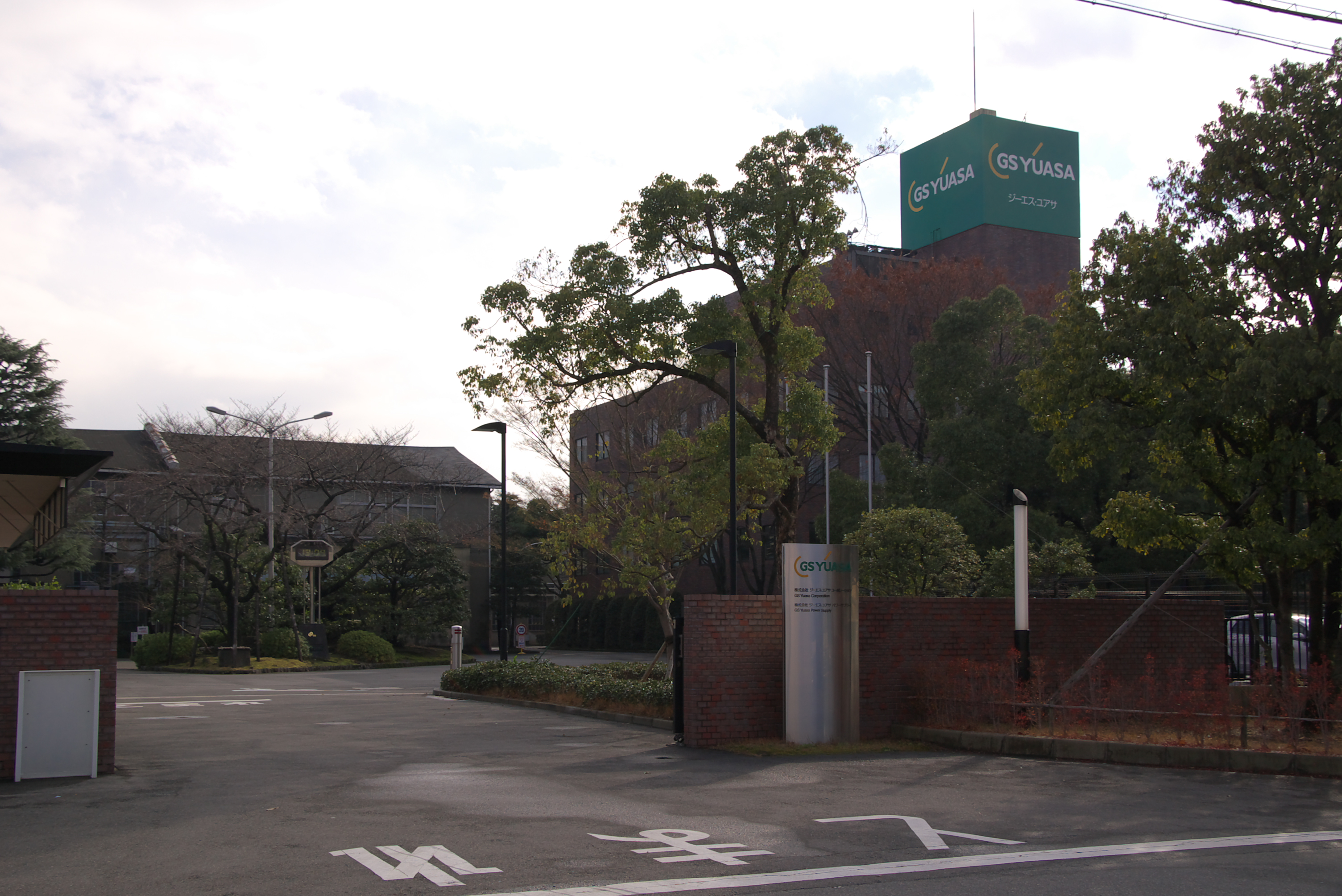
- Headquarter in Kyoto
- Type: Public (K.K)
- Traded as: TYO: 6674; Nikkei 225 Component
- Industry: Electrical equipment
- Predecessor: Japan Storage Battery Co., Ltd. Yuasa Corporation
- Founded: 1917; 109 years ago (Japan Storage Battery; later GS) 1918; 108 years ago (Yuasa Storage Battery) April 1, 2004; 22 years ago (by merger)
- Founder: Genzou Shimadzu Jr. Shichizaemon Yuasa
- Headquarters: Inobanba-cho, Nishinosho, Kisshoin, Minami-ku, Kyoto 601-8520, Japan
- Key people: Makoto Yoda (President)
- Products: Automotive, motorcycle and industrial batteries; Power supply systems; Lighting equipment
- Revenue: ▲US$2.93 billion (FY 2014) (JPY 348 billion) (FY 2014)
- Net income: ▲US$96.91 million (FY 2013) (JPY 9.98 billion) (FY 2013)
- Number of employees: 13,609 (consolidated)(as of March 31, 2014)
- Website: Official website

GS Yuasa Corporation (株式会社ジーエス・ユアサ コーポレーション, Kabushiki-gaisha GS Yuasa Kōporēshon) is a Kyoto-based Japanese company specializing in the development and production of lead acid and lithium-ion batteries, used in automobiles, motorcycles and other areas including aerospace and defense applications.

== History ==
=== Yuasa ===
In 1909, Shichizaemon Yuasa established Yuasa Iron Works to modernize the family business, founded in 1666 as a charcoal trading business. Yuasa Iron Works began producing storage batteries in 1915, and three years later Yuasa Storage Battery Co., Ltd was established. Soon after, Yuasa Storage Battery Co., Ltd began making Japan's first automotive batteries. In 1925, Yuasa began making dry cells, and in 1941 they began making alkaline cells. The dry battery business was later spun off into Yuasa Dry Battery Co., Ltd, which later merged back into Yuasa Storage Battery Co., Ltd to form Yuasa Battery Co, Ltd, later renamed to Yuasa Corporation.

=== GS ===
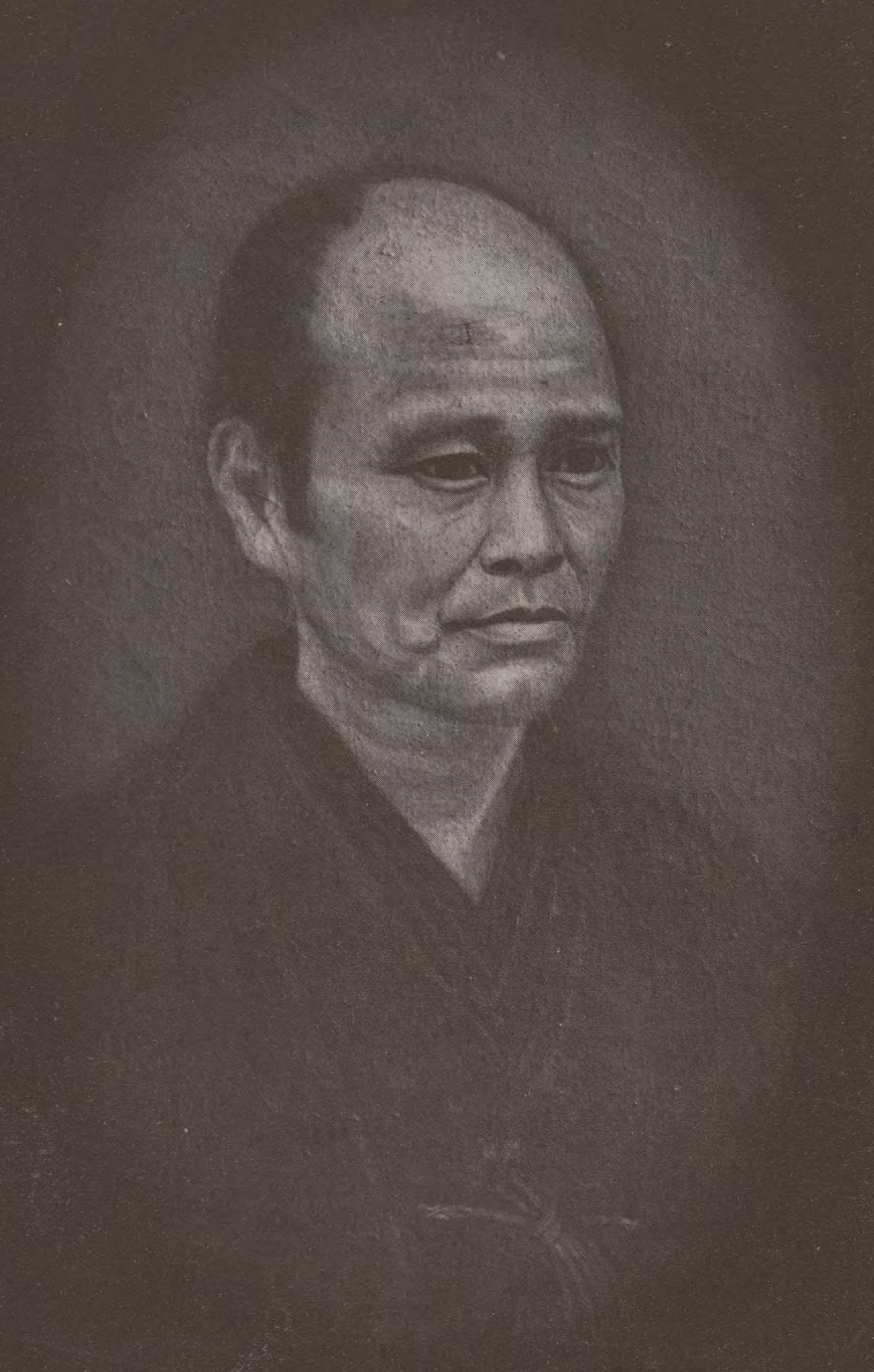
Genzo Shimadzu Sr.

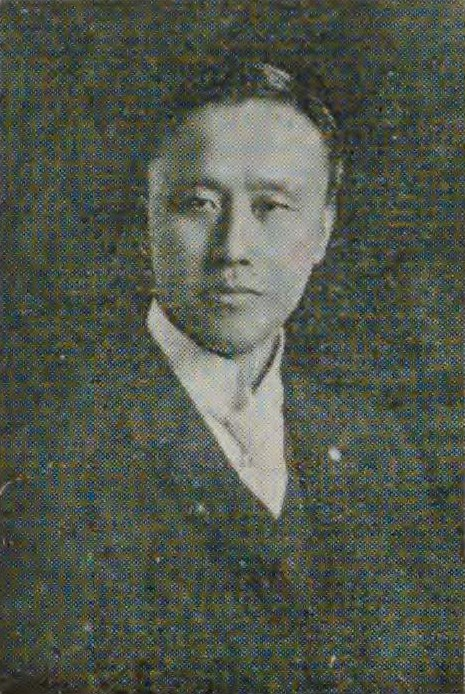
Genzo Shimadzu Jr.

In 1904, Genzo Shimadzu Jr. (島津 源蔵, Shimazu Genzō; b. 1869 d. 1951) developed a high-capacity lead-acid battery to supply backup power to his factory during outages of Kyoto's then unreliable power grid. The Japanese navy purchased 400 units of this battery. Shimadzu established Japan Storage Battery Co., Ltd in 1917 and began producing automotive batteries in 1919. In 1938 they began producing alkaline batteries and in 1940 they began making high-pressure mercury lamps.

GS was established in 1917 and is an abbreviation comprising the initials of Genzou Shimadzu Jr. who founded Japan Storage Battery in 1917. He was also the second president of Shimadzu Corporation founded in 1875 by his father, Genzo Shimadzu Sr. (島津 源蔵, Shimazu Genzō; b. 1839 d. 1894).

=== GS Yuasa ===
In 2004, Yuasa Corporation merged with Japan Storage Battery to form GS Yuasa Corporation.

As of 2014, GS Yuasa had 9 plants for manufacturing industrial lead-acid and NiCd batteries and 5 plants for Li-Ion cells. GS Yuasa also sells other products including power supplies, lamps and motorcycle batteries. Now the top power sports battery producer, Yuasa provides nearly 90% of the batteries used in power sport vehicles in North America.

== Joint ventures ==
GS Yuasa was one of the active players in the electric vehicle battery industry during the late 2000s to early 2010s when numerous battery vendors largely from Japan had formed alliances with car manufacturers to enter the novel market of EV.

=== Lithium Energy Japan ===
In 2007, GS Yuasa and Mitsubishi Motors have formed an alliance and started a joint venture named Lithium Energy Japan (LEJ) that develops and manufactures lithium-ion batteries for automotive and industrial use. The Mitsubishi i-MiEV, the first mass-produced electric car, was equipped with the batteries from LEJ.

=== Blue Energy Co. ===
In 2009, Honda partnered with GS Yuasa to set up an EV battery supplier Blue Energy Co. (BEC). The HVs from Honda including Civic Hybrid have been powered by lithium-ion batteries manufactured by BEC which has a production facility in Kyoto. However, Honda has been in search for new partners aside from BEC since the late 2010s, teaming up with various companies like Nissan, General Motors, and CATL.

=== Lithium Energy & Power GmbH ===
In 2014, Robert Bosch GmbH and GS Yuasa partnered on next-gen Li-ion EV battery with the ambitious goals to double energy density and make it to mass market by 2020 while lowering the cost by half as well. The venture has ended without a meaningful outcome after Bosch has decided to outsource battery cell manufacturing in 2018.

== Overseas operations ==
=== United States ===
==== Yuasa Battery Inc ====
Yuasa Battery, Inc (U.S.A.) was established in 1965. In 1979, Yuasa began producing motorcycle batteries in a joint venture established with General Battery Corporation in Laureldale, PA a few years earlier. Today, Yuasa Battery Inc supplies batteries for motorcycles, scooters, personal watercraft, all-terrain vehicles (ATV), and side by sides (UTV).

==== Yuasa-Exide Inc ====
In 1987 Fruit of the Loom sold its General Battery Corporation to Exide Corporation. In 1991, Yuasa Battery Co. Ltd (Japan) bought Exide's industrial battery division, forming Yuasa-Exide Inc, later renamed to Yuasa Inc. In 2000, a management buyout of Yuasa Inc's industrial battery business formed Enersys.

Today, Enersys sells a wide variety of batteries.

=== Europe ===
In 1981, Yuasa established a company in the UK to manufacture VRLA batteries and another for sales and distribution. They later established companies in Germany, France, and Italy for sales and distribution. In 1988, Yuasa Corporation acquired a 50% share in Lucas Batteries Ltd, forming Lucas-Yuasa Batteries Ltd. Yuasa purchased the remaining 50% of Lucas Batteries in 1997, creating Yuasa Automotive Batteries Europe Ltd, which marketed automotive batteries under the Lucas brand and other names until 2006, when Yuasa began marketing automotive batteries in Europe under its own name. In 2002, Yuasa Battery Europe Ltd was formed as the parent company for Yuasa's various European sales companies.

Today, Yuasa Battery Europe Ltd sells a variety of batteries.

=== Australia ===
Century Batteries Australia is a division of Century Yuasa Batteries Pty Ltd and an affiliate of the GS Yuasa Corporation.

=== Vietnam ===
GS Battery VietNam Co., Ltd is a company 100% foreign owned capital, joint venture between GS-Yuasa Corporation and Mitsubishi Corporation.

== Miscellaneous ==
=== Boeing 787 ===
The parent company in Japan was linked to faulty electrics used in Boeing's 787 Dreamliner plane. The electrical battery control system was made by Thales Group which also selected GS Yuasa. All Nippon Airways (ANA) had replaced 10 batteries (of 17 planes) while Japan Airlines (JAL) had replaced "several" on its 7 planes, before recent mishaps. As of January 29, 2013, the Japan Transport Safety Board has approved the Yuasa factory quality control and continues to investigate the damaged battery of the ANA 787. Meanwhile, the American National Transportation Safety Board continues to look for defects in the Boston JAL 787 battery.

== Gallery ==
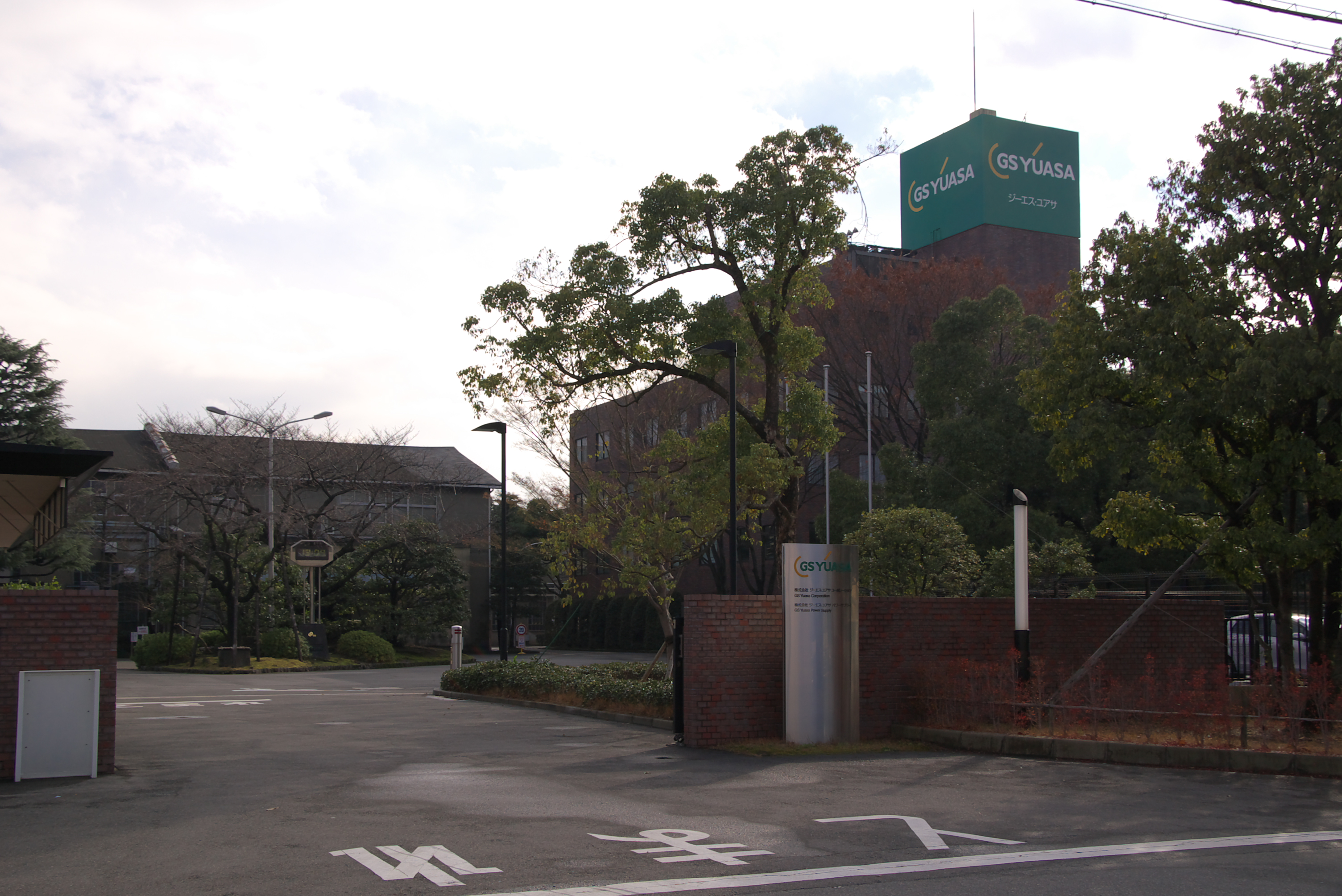
GS Yuasa Corporation headquarters in Kyoto

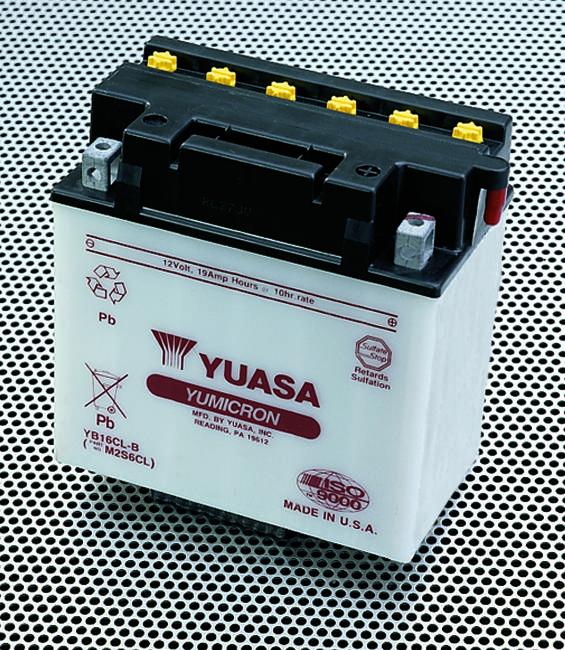
A Yuasa USA made Personal Watercraft battery

== See also ==
- Smart BEST, an experimental train powered by GS Yuasa lithium-ion batteries
