= Smart BEST =

Japanese experimental self-charging battery electric multiple unit train

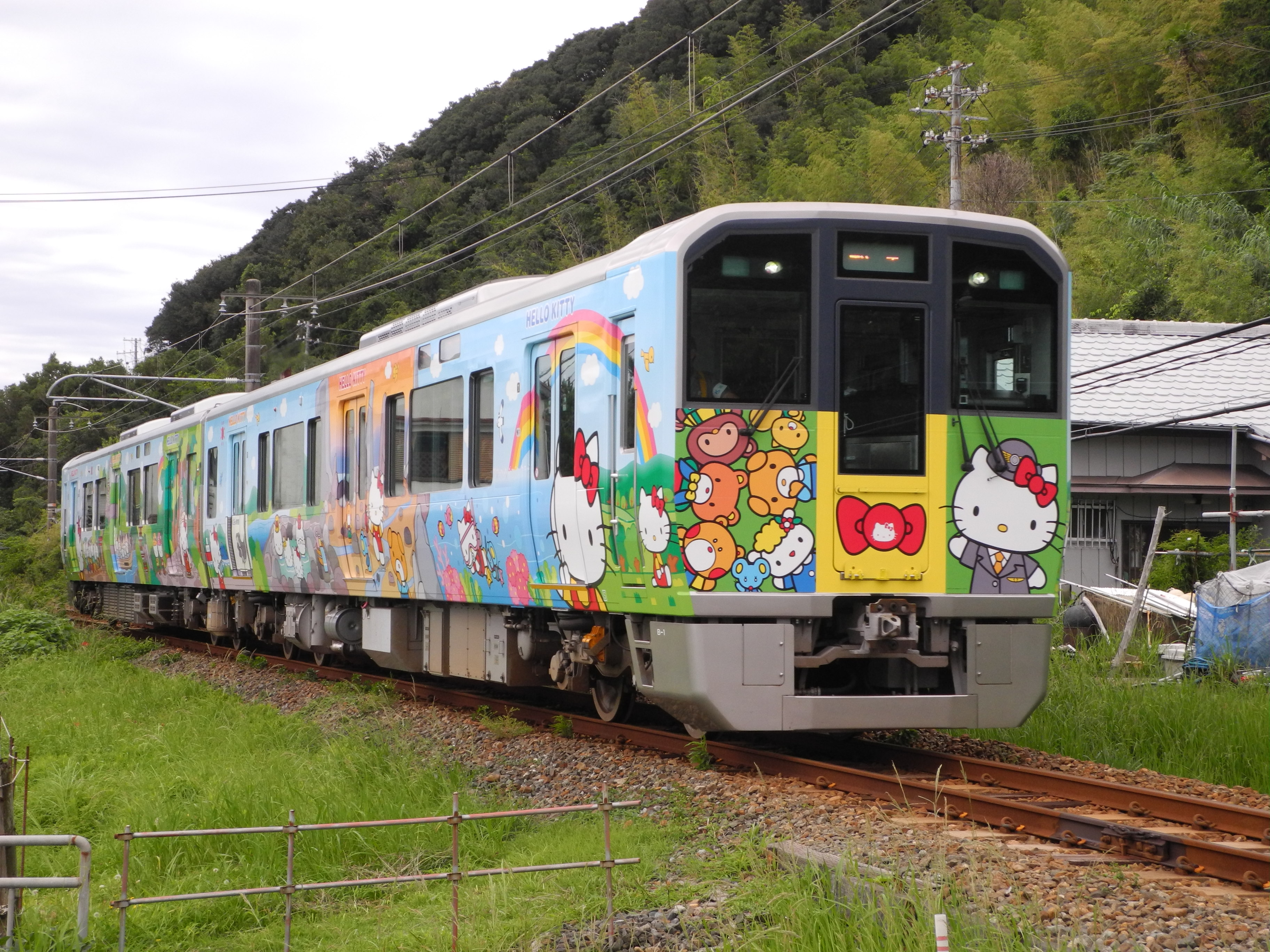
- The Smart BEST train in service in "Hello Kitty" livery, September 2014
- Manufacturer: Kinki Sharyo
- Built at: Osaka
- Constructed: 2012
- Number built: 2 vehicles (1 set)
- Formation: 2 cars per trainset
- Capacity: 259 per set

Specifications
- Car length: 20,000 mm (65 ft 7 in)
- Width: 2,950 mm (9 ft 8 in)
- Floor height: 1,120 mm (3 ft 8 in)
- Doors: 3 pairs per side
- Maximum speed: 100 km/h (62 mph)
- Acceleration: 2.3 km/(h⋅s) (1.4 mph/s)
- Deceleration: 3.1 km/(h⋅s) (1.9 mph/s)
- Electric system(s): Battery
- Bogies: KD318 (motored), KD318A (trailer)
- Track gauge: 1,067 mm (3 ft 6 in)

The Smart BEST is an experimental Japanese two-car self-charging battery electric multiple unit (BEMU) train developed and manufactured by Kinki Sharyo in 2012 to demonstrate the feasibility of battery train technology for use on non-electrified rural lines. The name is an acronym for "Battery Engine Synergy Train". The train has been tested on JR West and JR Shikoku lines since late 2012.

== Overview ==
The Smart BEST train operates using GS Yuasa LIM30H-8A lithium-ion storage battery modules recharged in operation by a small-capacity "e-Brid Plus" diesel engine. The train normally operates at a maximum speed of 70 km/h (43 mph), but is capable of 100 km/h (62 mph) over short distances.

== Formation ==
The two-car train is formed as shown below, with one motored (M) car and one non-powered trailer (T) car.

Designation	Mc	Tc
Numbering	DGBC2A-1	DGBC2B-1
Passenger capacity (total/seated)	129/52	130/51

== Interior ==
Seating accommodation is arranged as 2+2 abreast transverse seating with seat backs that flip over to face the direction of travel.

== History ==
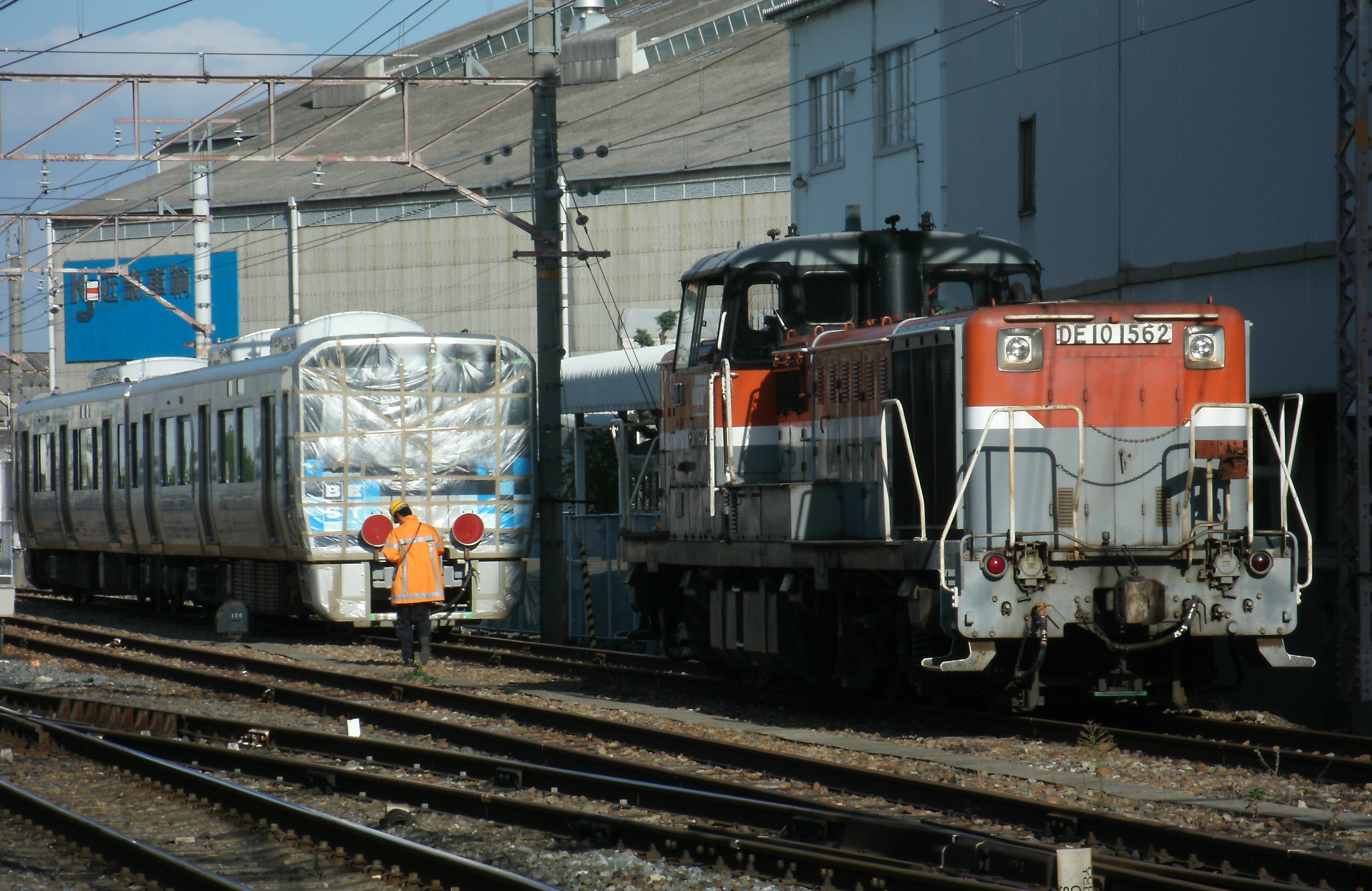
The Smart BEST train being moved back to Kinki Sharyo in December 2012

The "Smart BEST" train was unveiled to the media in October 2012 at the Kinki Sharyo factory in Osaka, before being moved to Yonago, Tottori for test running on the Sanin Main Line, Sakai Line, and Hakubi Line. It was returned to Kinki Sharyo in December 2012. In December 2013, the train was moved to Takamatsu, Kagawa, and started test running on a number of lines in Shikoku, including the Kōtoku Line, Naruto Line, and Tokushima Line.

From September until December 2014, the train was used in revenue service on promotional "Hello Kitty" services in the Wakayama area.

== See also ==
- NE Train, an experimental battery railcar tested by JR East
- EV-E301 series, a BEMU set operated by JR East on the Karasuyama Line since 2014
- BEC819 series, an AC BEMU operated by JR Kyushu since 2016
- EV-E801 series, an AC BEMU operated by JR East on the Oga Line since 2017
