= EV-E301 series =

Japanese battery electric train

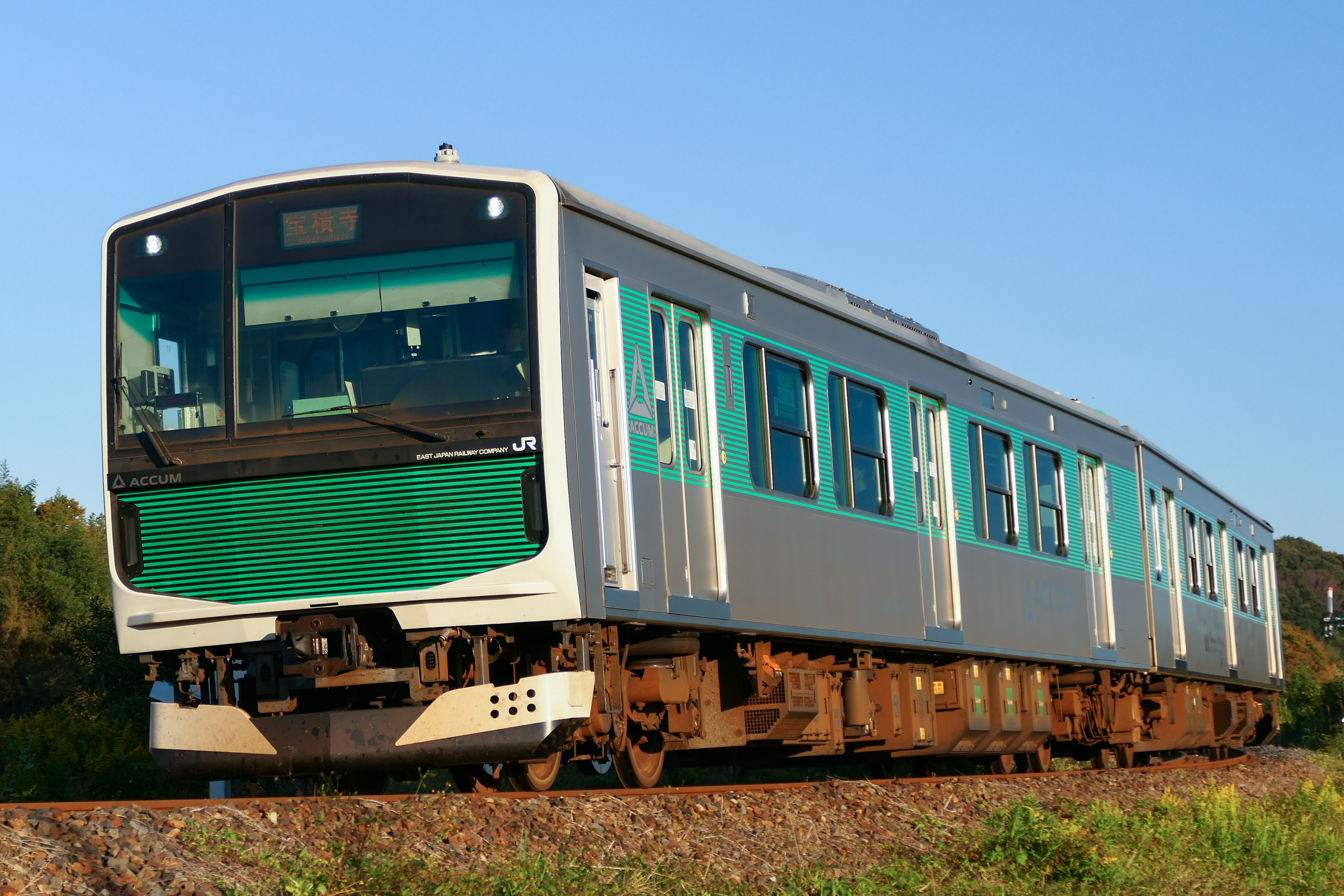
- Set V1 in service in October 2023
- Manufacturer: J-TREC
- Built at: Yokohama
- Family name: Accum
- Replaced: KiHa 40 series
- Constructed: 2014
- Entered service: 15 March 2014
- Number built: 8 vehicles (4 sets)
- Number in service: 8 vehicles (4 sets)
- Formation: 2 cars per trainset
- Fleet numbers: V1–V4
- Capacity: 265 per set
- Operator: JR East
- Depot: Oyama
- Lines served: Karasuyama Line, Tohoku Main Line

Specifications
- Car length: 20,000 mm (65 ft 7 3/8 in)
- Width: 2,800 mm (9 ft 2 1/4 in)
- Floor height: 1,130 mm (3 ft 8 1/2 in)
- Doors: 3 pairs per side
- Maximum speed: 65 km/h (40 mph) (service); 100 km/h (62 mph) (design)
- Traction system: Mitsubishi IGBT-VVVF
- Acceleration: 2.0 km/(h⋅s) (1.2 mph/s)
- Deceleration: 3.6 km/(h⋅s) (2.2 mph/s)
- Electric system: 1,500 V DC overhead line
- Current collection: Pantograph
- Bogies: DT79 (motored), TR255D (trailer)
- Safety system: ATS-P
- Track gauge: 1,067 mm (3 ft 6 in)

The EV-E301 series (EV-E301系) is a two-car battery electric multiple unit (BEMU) train type operated by East Japan Railway Company (JR East) on the Karasuyama Line and Tohoku Main Line since 15 March 2014. The train is branded as "Accum" (Akyumu).

== Overview ==
Developed from the experimental "Smart Denchi-kun" battery railcar tested on the Karasuyama Line in 2012, the two-car EV-E301 series train operates as an electric multiple unit (EMU) under the 1,500 V DC overhead wire of the Tohoku Main Line between Utsunomiya and Hōshakuji, and on battery power over the 20.4 km (12.7 mi) non-electrified Karasuyama Line. It can also be recharged via its pantographs at a recharging facility specially built at Karasuyama Station.

The two-car trainsets are equipped with 190 kWh lithium-ion storage batteries, and the train has a maximum design speed of 100 km/h (62 mph), although it normally runs at up to 65 km/h (40 mph) at service.

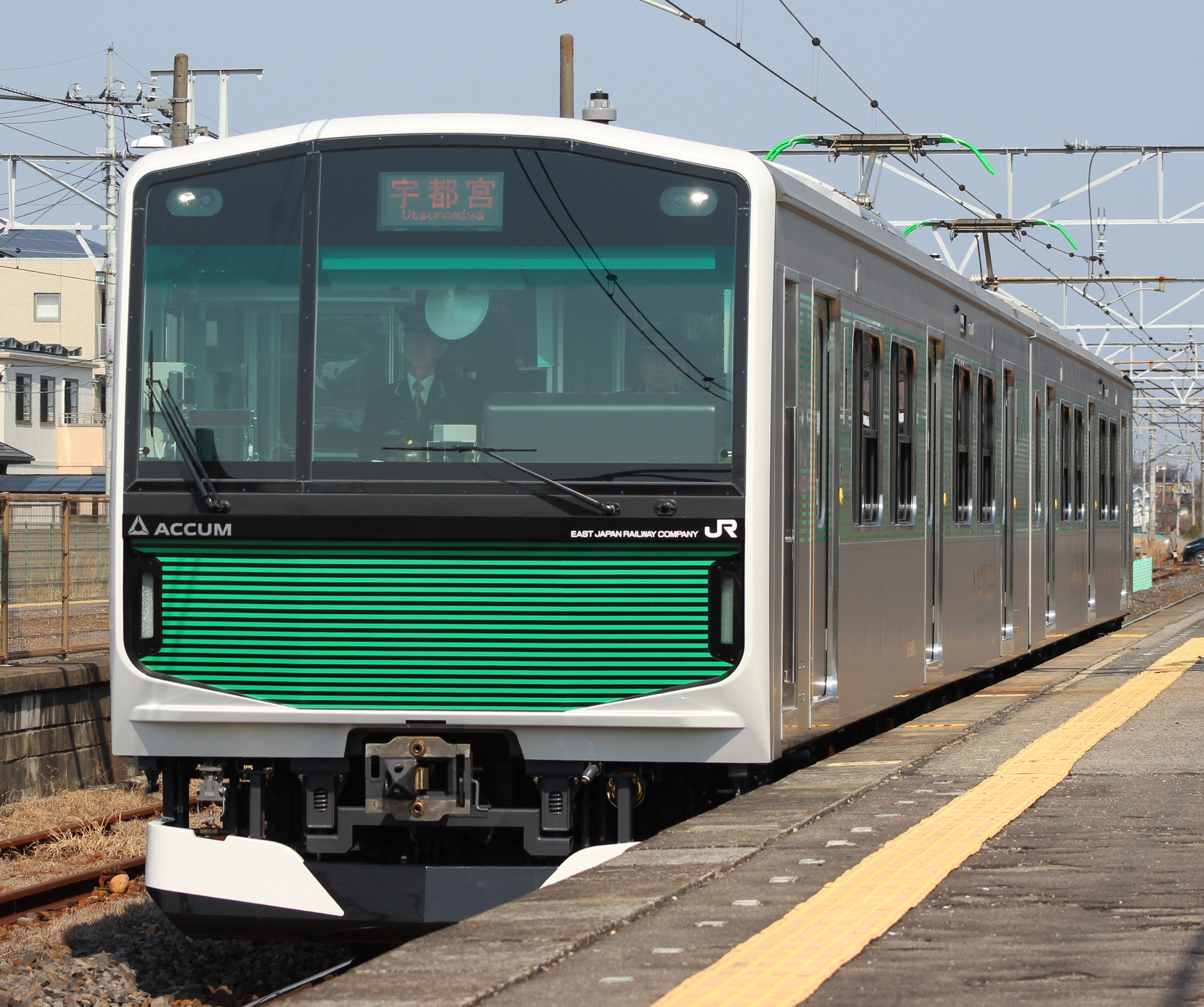
Set V1 running under overhead wires on the Tohoku Line in March 2014

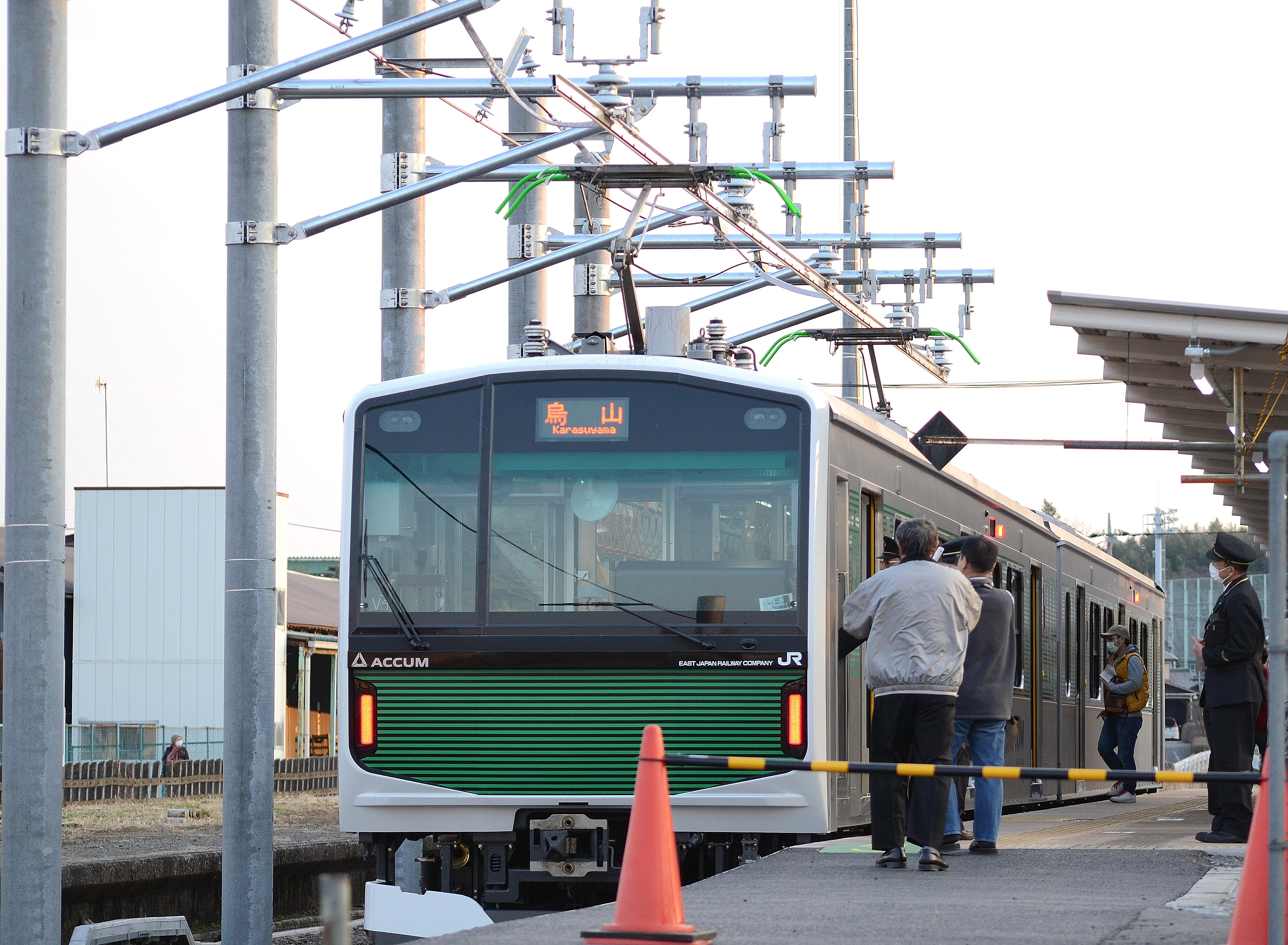
Set V1 being recharged at Karasuyama Station in March 2014

== Formation ==
The two-car trains are formed as shown below, with car 1 at the Utsunomiya end.

Car No.	1	2
Designation	Mc'	Mc
Type	EV-E300	EV-E301
Weight (t)	37.7	40.2
Passenger capacity (seated/total)	48/133	48/133

The Mc car has two PS38 single-arm pantographs.

== Interior ==
Internally, the train uses LED lighting throughout. Seating accommodation consists of longitudinal bench seating. The train is not equipped with a toilet.

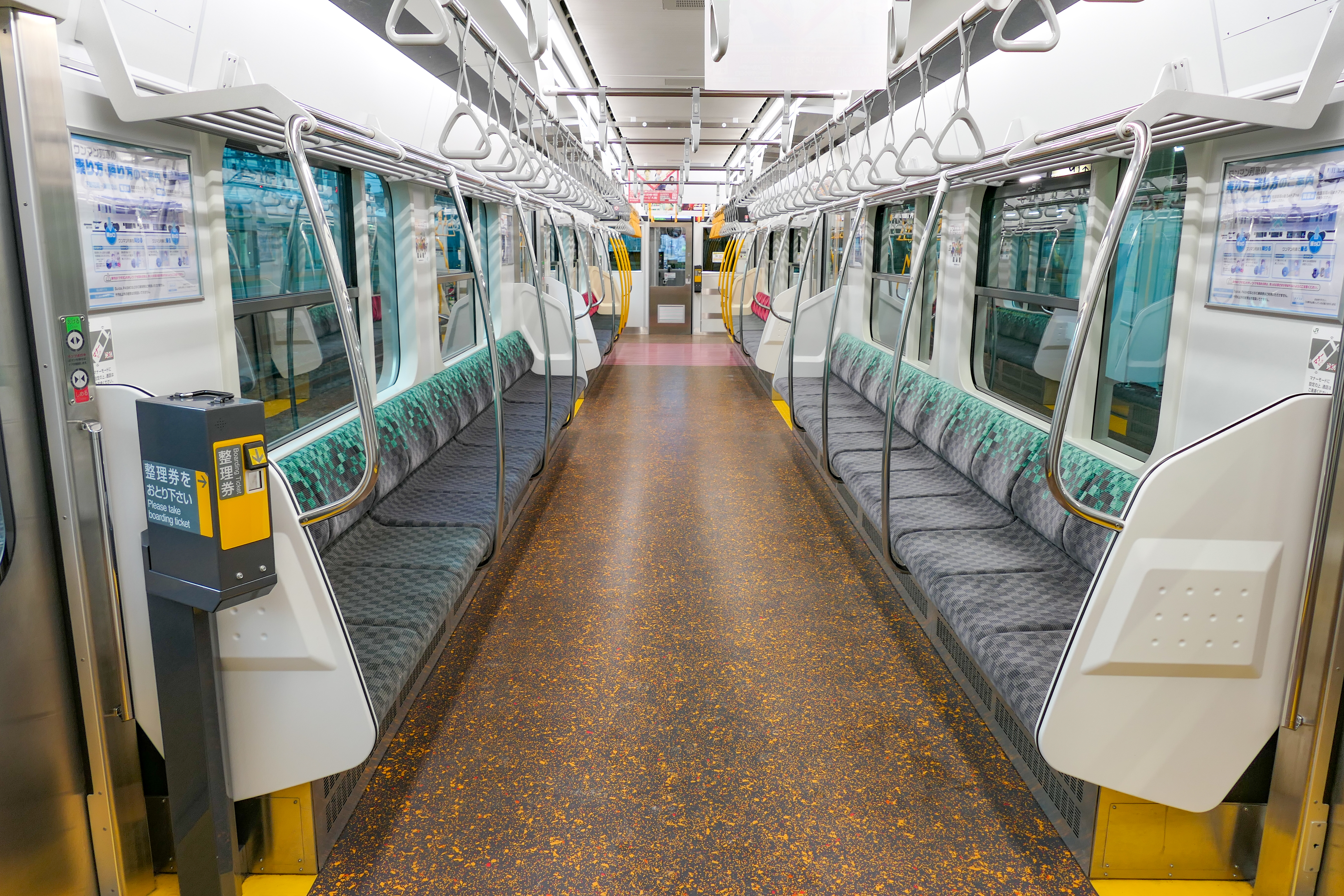
View of the interior

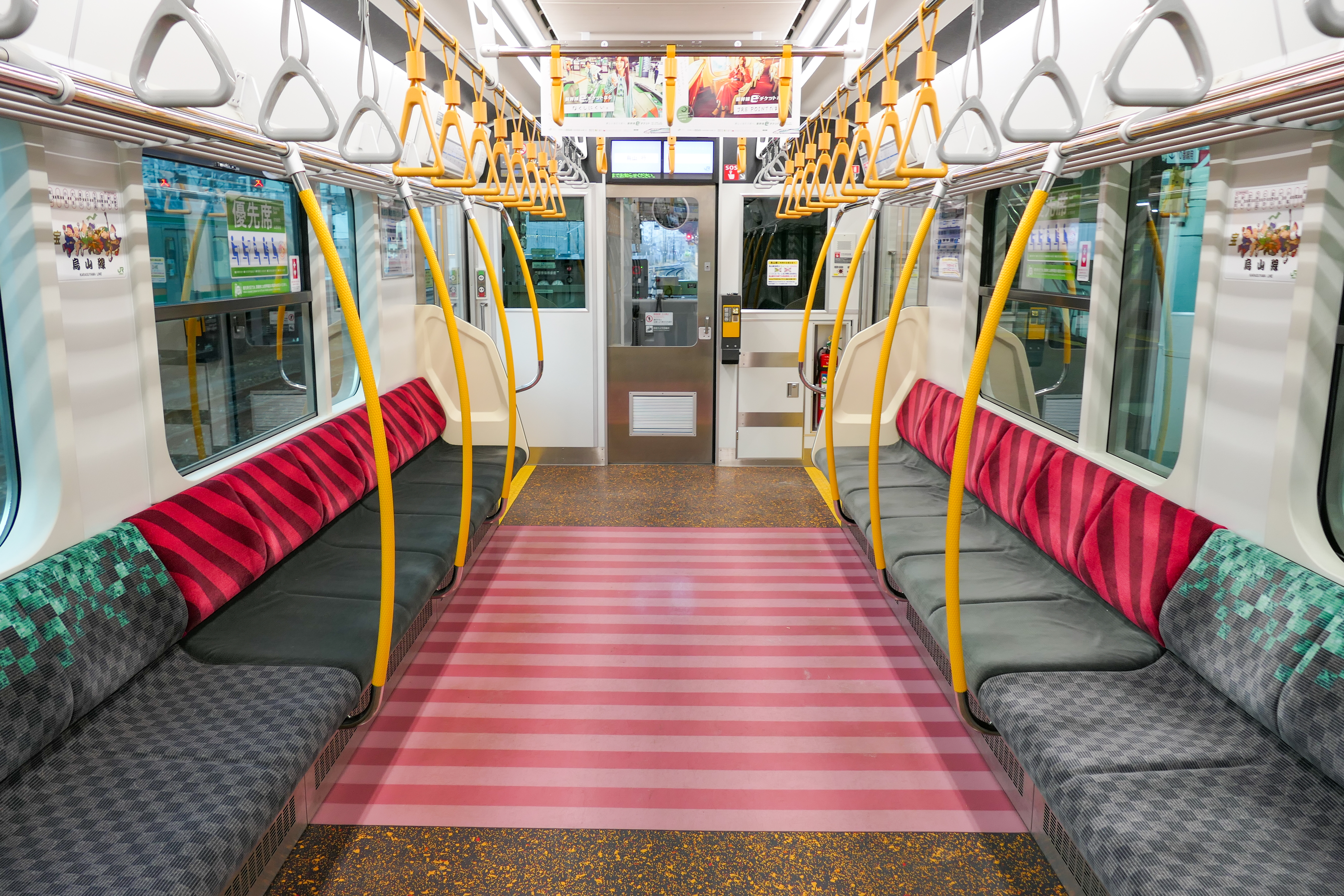
Priority seating

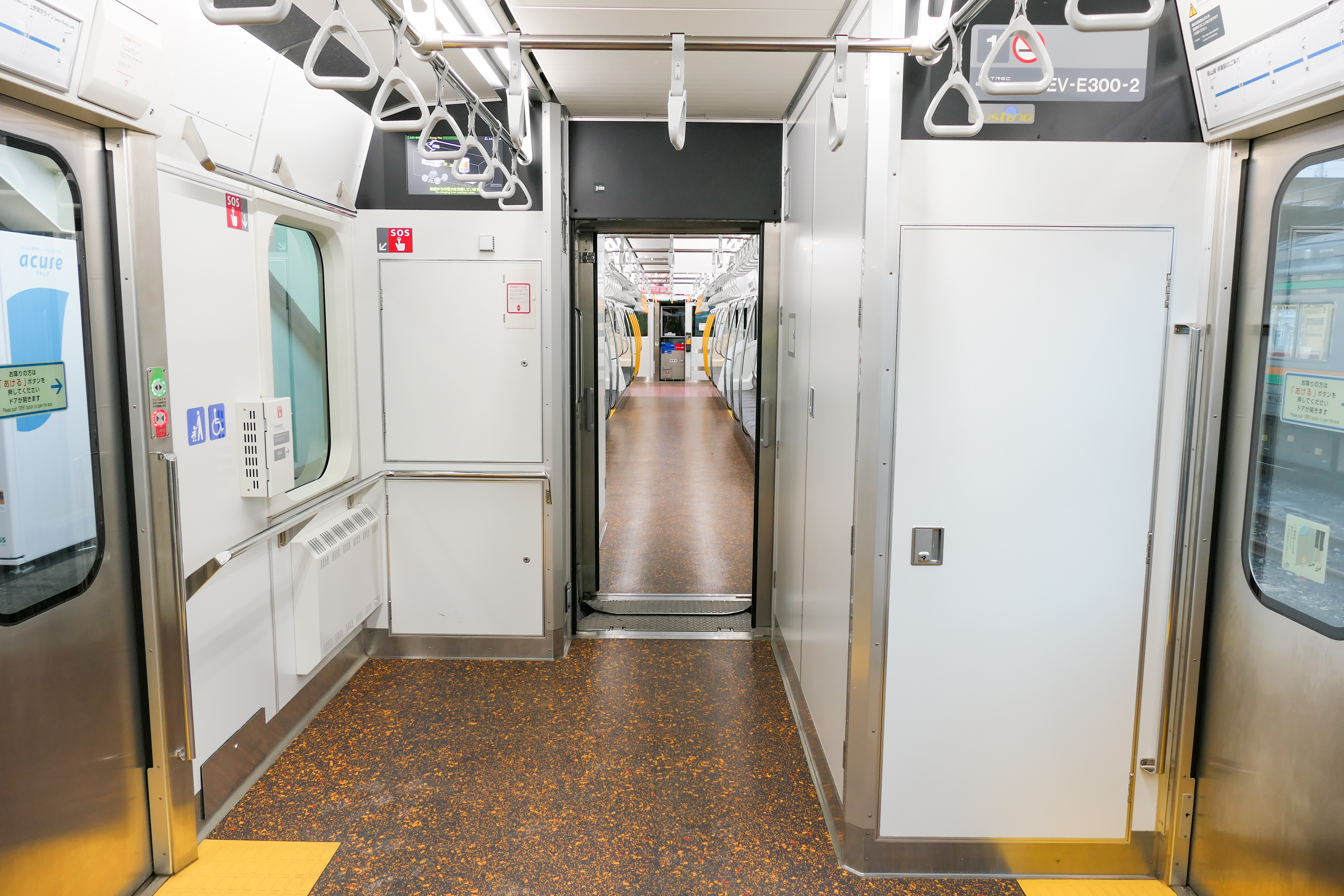
Equipment room and free space

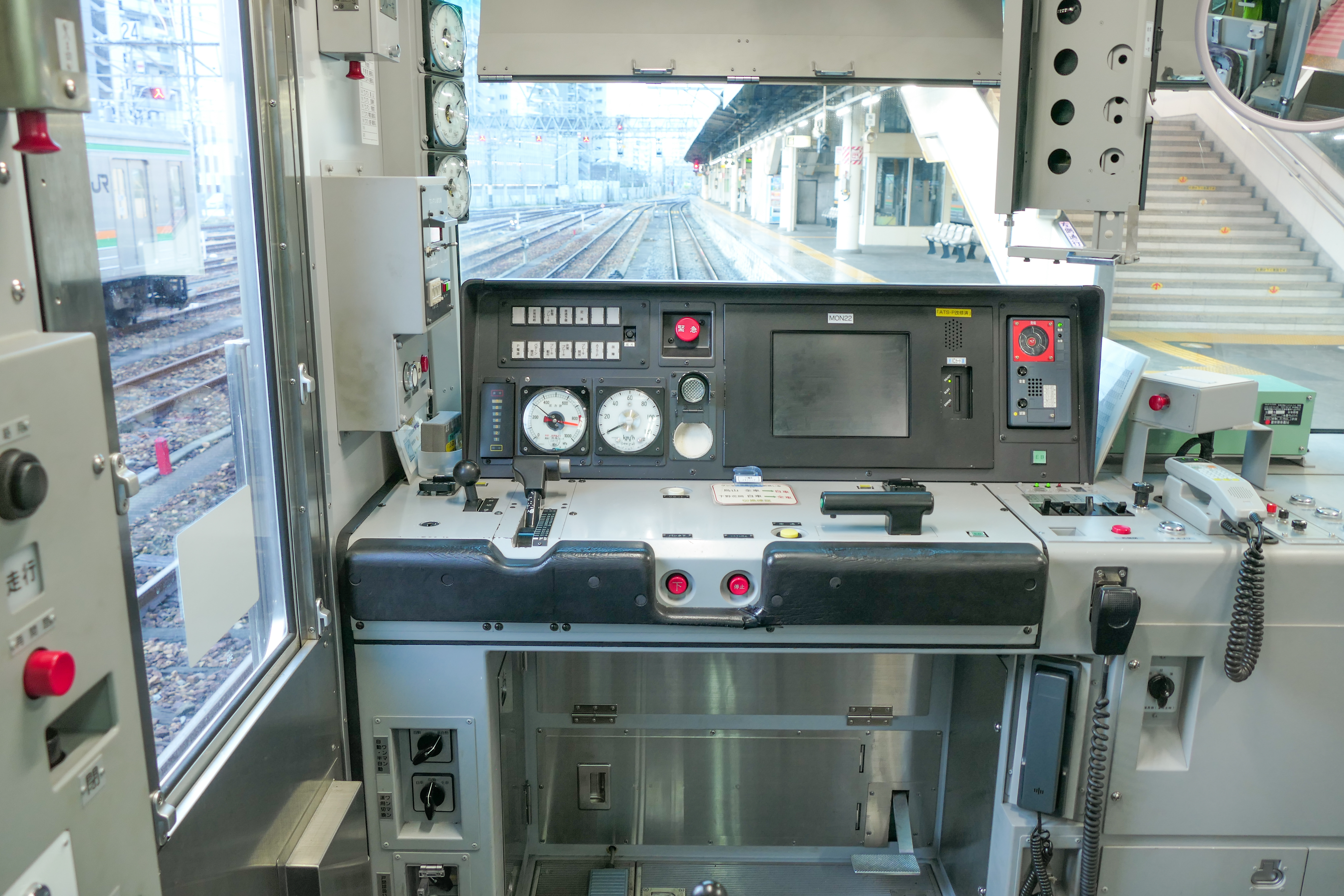
Driver's cab

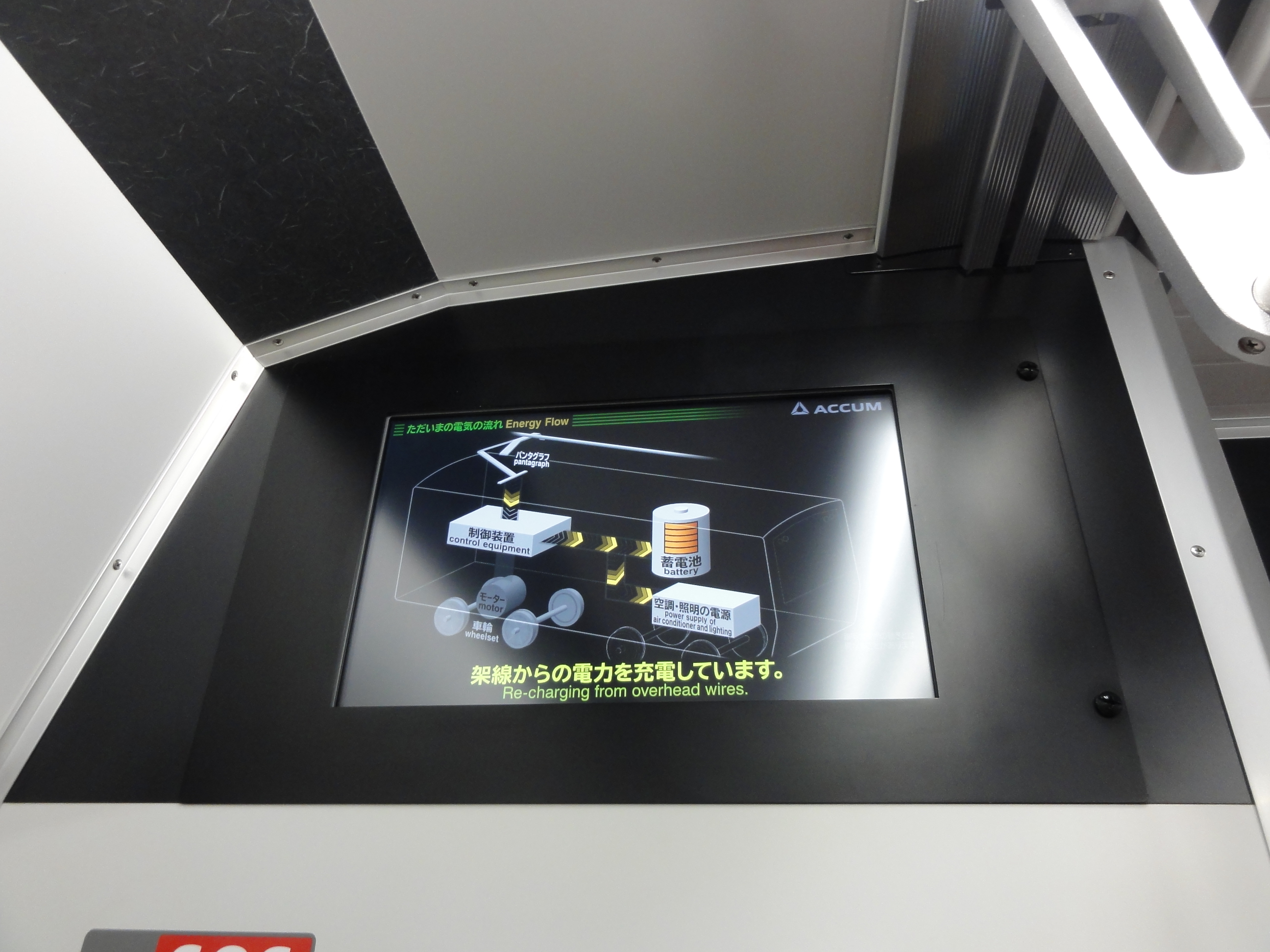
LCD

== Bogies ==
Each car is mounted on a TR255D non-powered trailer bogie at the outer end, and a DT79 motored bogie at the inner end.

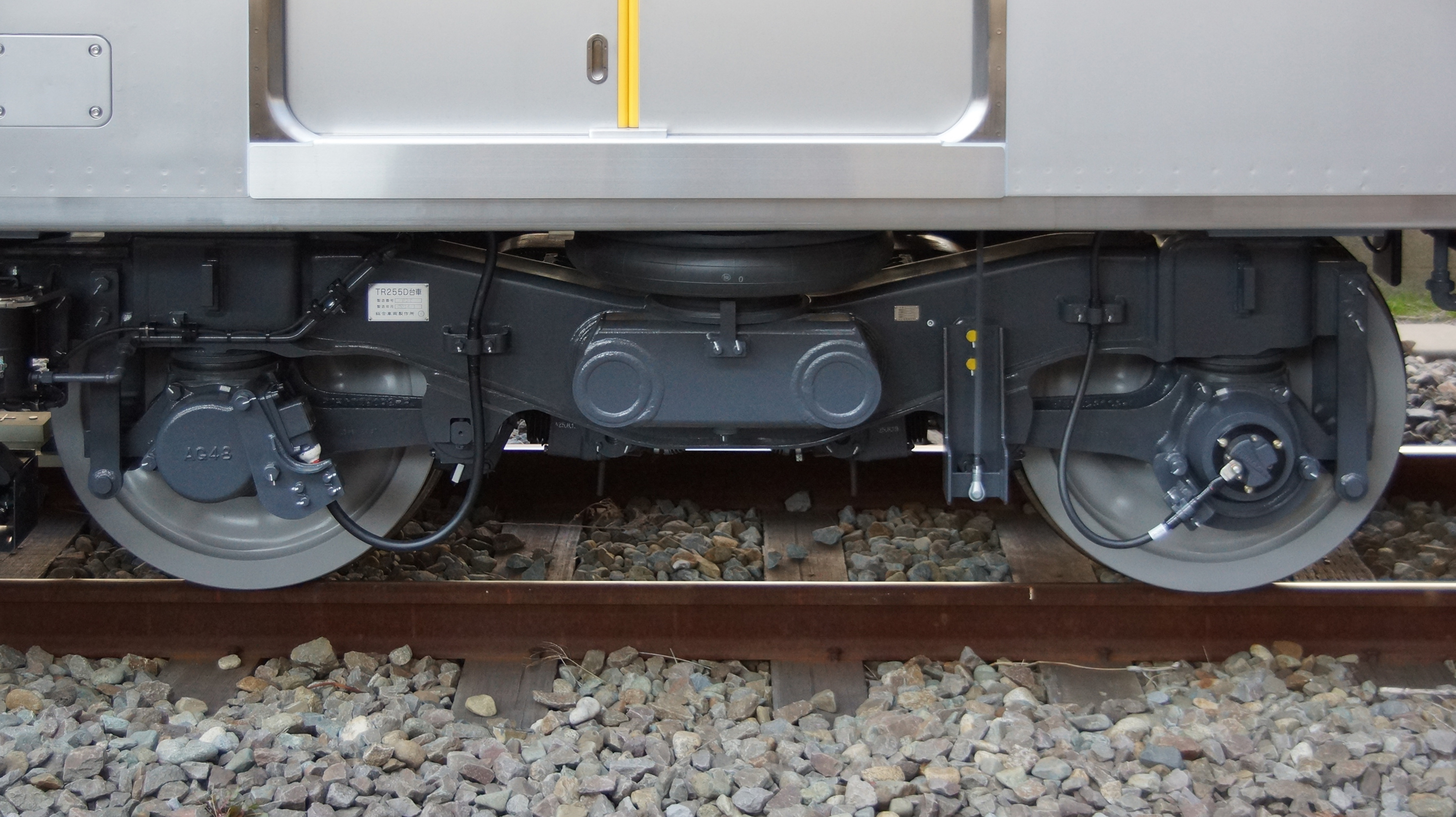
TR233D trailer bogie

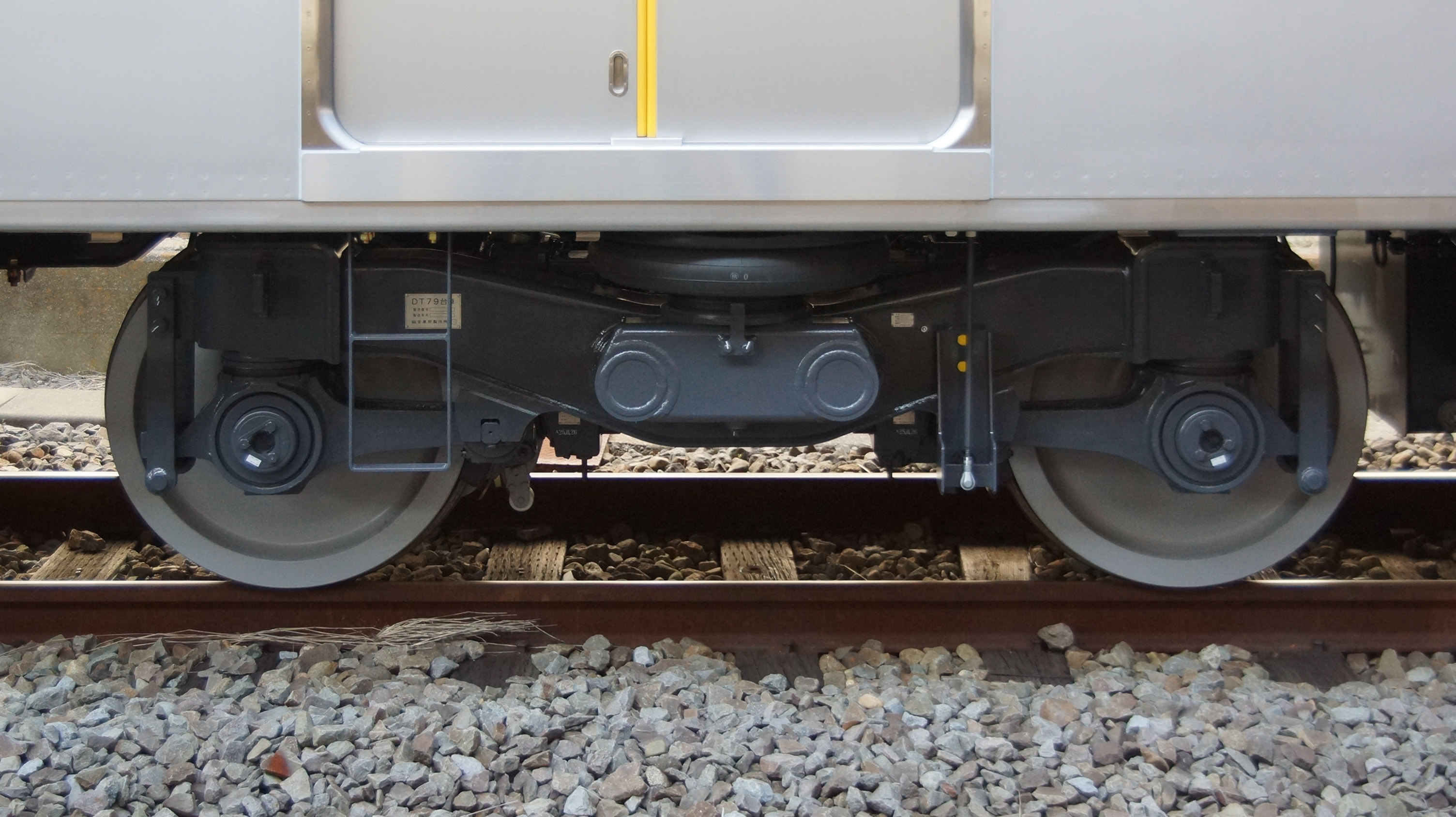
DT79 motor bogie

== History ==
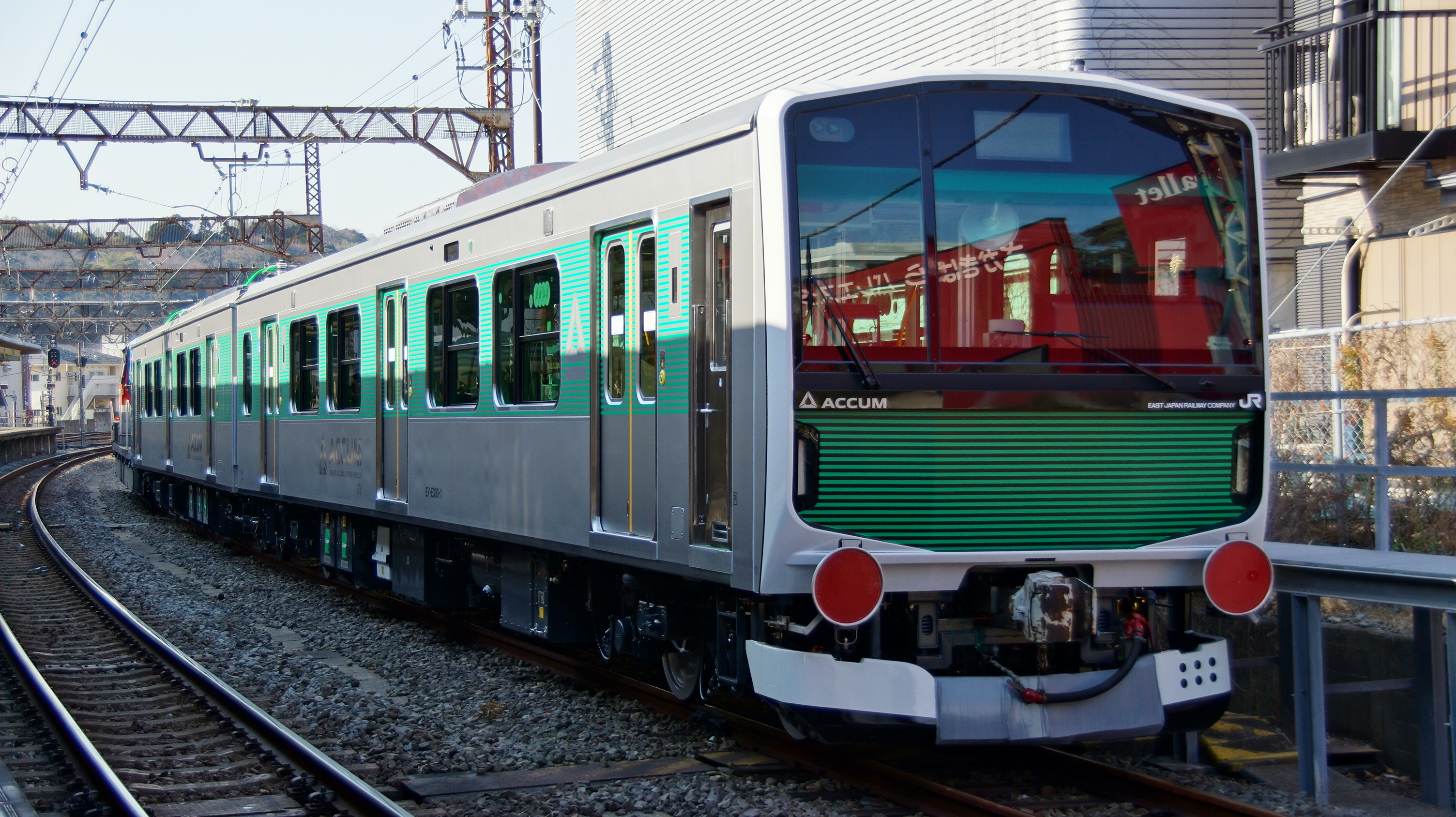
The first set, V1, on delivery from J-TREC in January 2014

The first set, V1, was delivered from the Japan Transport Engineering Company (J-TREC) factory in Yokohama on 21 January 2014. Test running commenced on 23 January, on the Utsunomiya Line, including running on battery power with the pantographs lowered. It entered revenue service on the Karasuyama Line from the start of the revised timetable on 15 March 2014.

In May 2015, the EV-E301 series was awarded the 2015 Laurel Prize, presented annually by the Japan Railfan Club. A presentation ceremony was held at Karasuyama Station on 26 September 2015.

A further three two-car EV-E301 series trainsets were delivered to Utsunomiya from the J-TREC factory in Yokohama in February 2017. These entered service from the start of the revised timetable on 4 March 2017, replacing the remaining diesel multiple-unit trains operating on the Karasuyama Line.

== See also ==
- Smart BEST, a self-charging BEMU train developed by Kinki Sharyo in 2012
- BEC819 series, an AC BEMU introduced by JR Kyushu in 2016
- EV-E801 series, an AC BEMU introduced by JR East on the Oga Line in 2017
