= EV-E801 series =

Japanese battery electric multiple unit train type

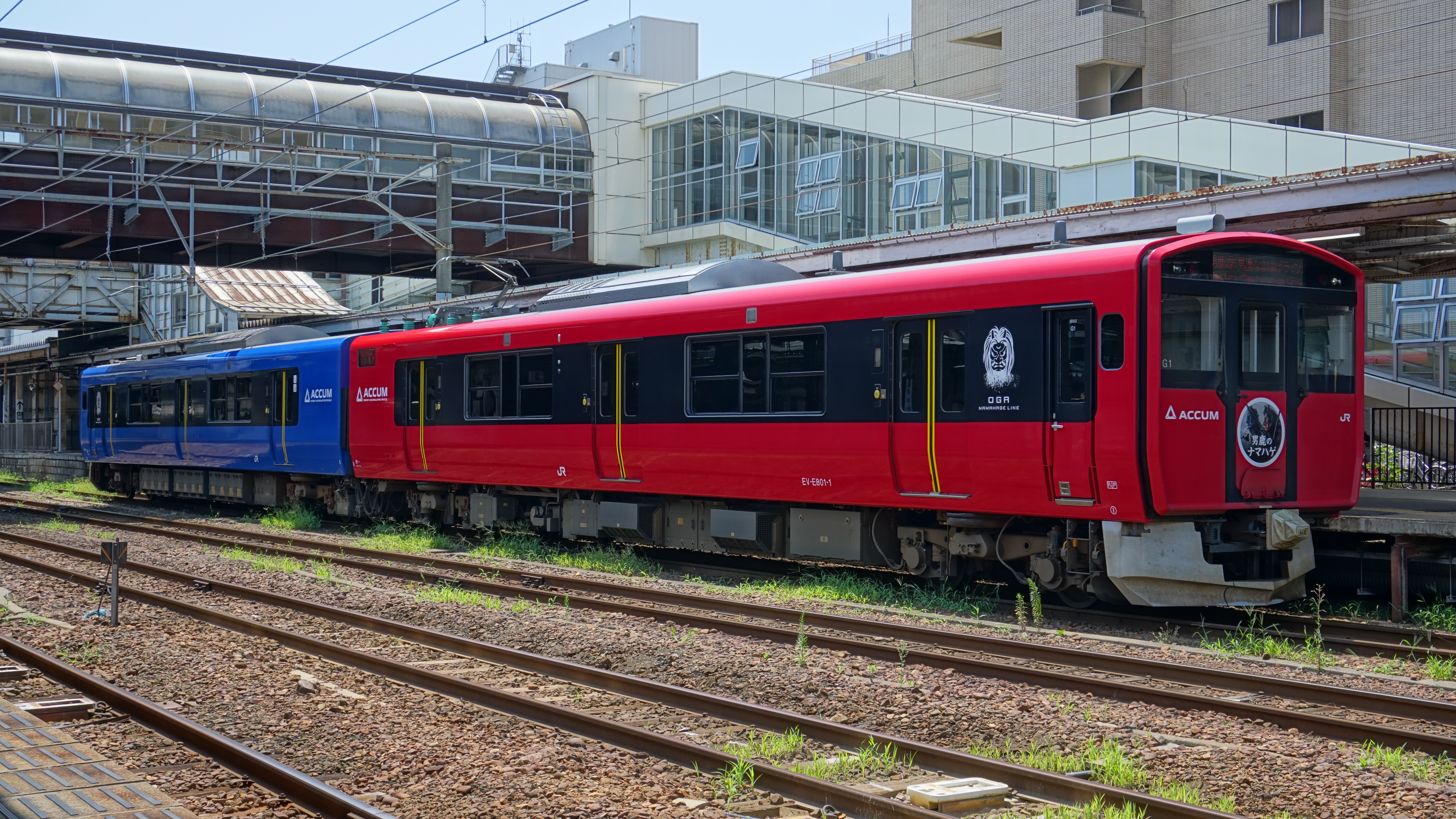
- EV-E801 series set G1 in August 2019
- Manufacturer: Hitachi
- Built at: Kudamatsu, Yamaguchi
- Family name: Accum
- Replaced: KiHa 40 series
- Constructed: 2016, 2020
- Entered service: 4 March 2017
- Number built: 12 vehicles (6 sets)
- Number in service: 12 vehicles (6 sets)
- Formation: 2 cars per trainset
- Fleet numbers: G1-G6
- Capacity: 256 per set
- Operator: JR East
- Depot: Akita
- Lines served: Ou Main Line, Oga Line

Specifications
- Car length: 20,000 mm (65 ft 7 in)
- Floor height: 1,135 mm (44.7 in)
- Doors: 3 pairs per side
- Maximum speed: 110 km/h (68 mph) (overhead wire); 85 km/h (53 mph) (battery)
- Traction system: IGBT-VVVF (Hitachi)
- Electric system: 20 kV 50 Hz AC Overhead line
- Track gauge: 1,067 mm (3 ft 6 in)

The EV-E801 series (EV-E801系, EV-E801-kei) is a two-car battery electric multiple unit (BEMU) train type operated by East Japan Railway Company (JR East) on the Oga Line in Akita Prefecture in northern Japan since 4 March 2017. The train is branded as "Accum" (Akyumu).

== Overview ==
The train is derived from the experimental 817 series BEMU train developed by JR Kyushu, and will incorporate modifications to cope with the colder climate of Akita Prefecture.

The two-car EV-E801 series train operates as an electric multiple unit (EMU) under the 20 kV AC overhead wire of the Ou Main Line between Akita and Oiwake, a distance of 13.0 km (8.1 mi), and on battery power over the non-electrified Oga Line tracks between Oiwake and Oga, a distance of 26.6 km (16.5 mi), replacing existing KiHa 40 diesel multiple unit (DMU) trains. It can also be recharged via its pantograph at a 20 kV AC recharging facility specially built at Oga Station.

The EV-E800 car is equipped with lithium-ion storage batteries with a total capacity of 360 kWh (at 1,598 V), and operates at a maximum speed of 110 km/h (70 mph) under overhead wires and at 85 km/h (55 mph) on battery power over non-electrified tracks.

== Formation ==
The two-car train is formed as shown below, with one driving motor ("Mc") and one driving trailer ("Tc") car.

| Designation | Mc | Tc' |
| Numbering | EV-E801-1 | EV-E800-1 |
| Weight (t) | 38.1 | 37.5 |
| Passenger capacity (seated/total) | 40/129 | 40/127 |

The Mc car is fitted with one single-arm pantograph.

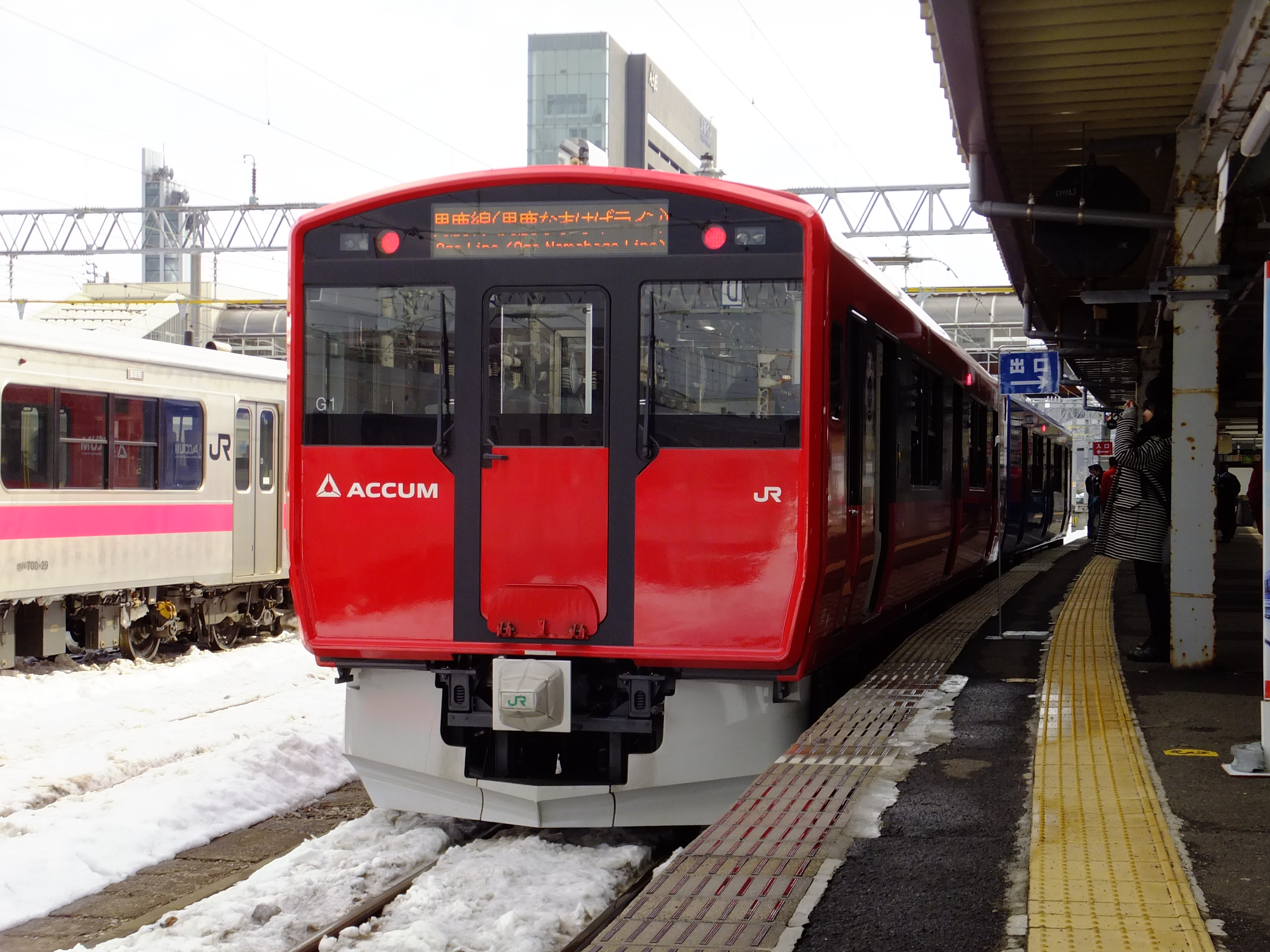
Car EV-E801-1 in February 2017

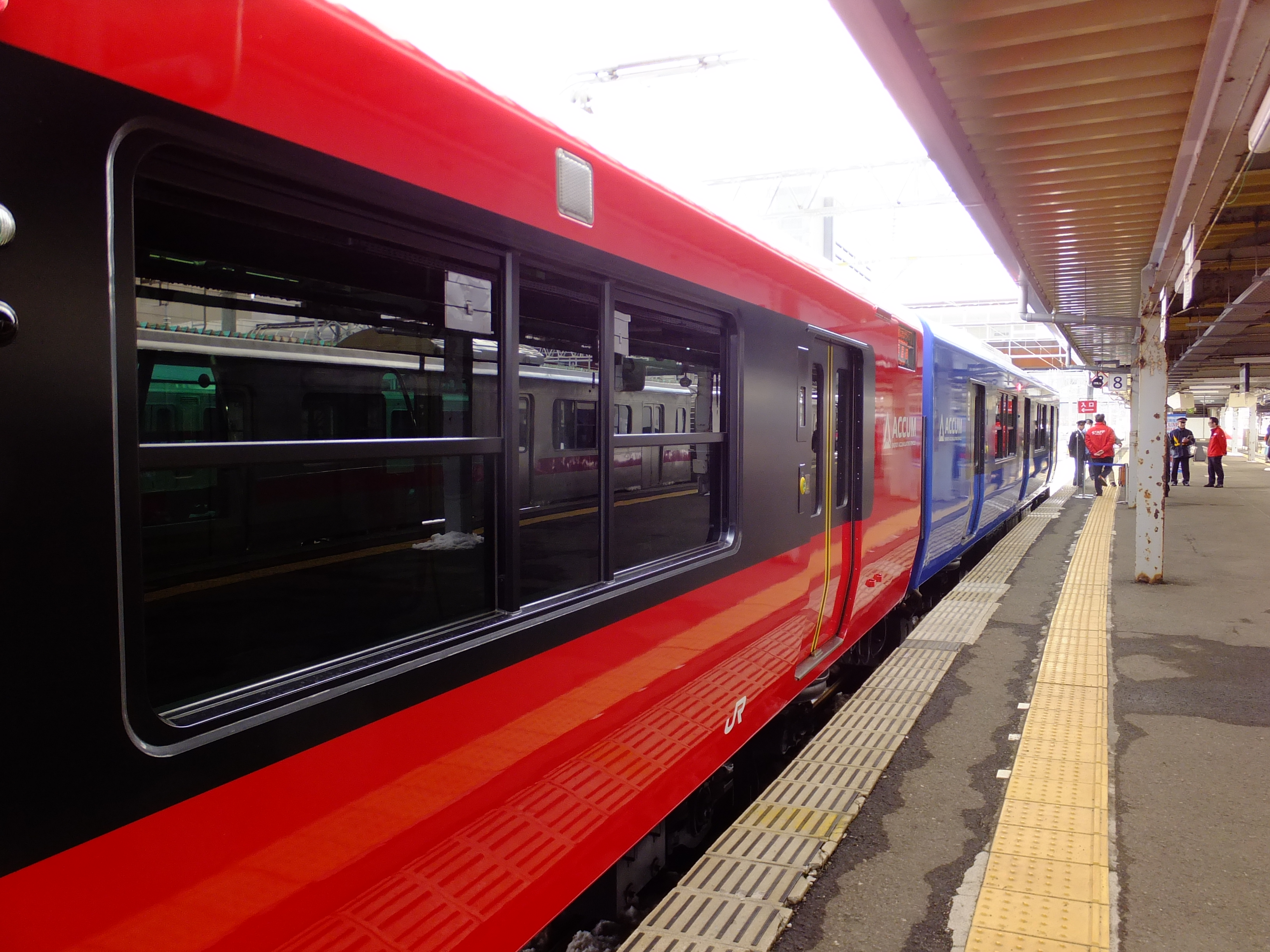
Car EV-E801-1 (left) and EV-E800-1 (right) in February 2017

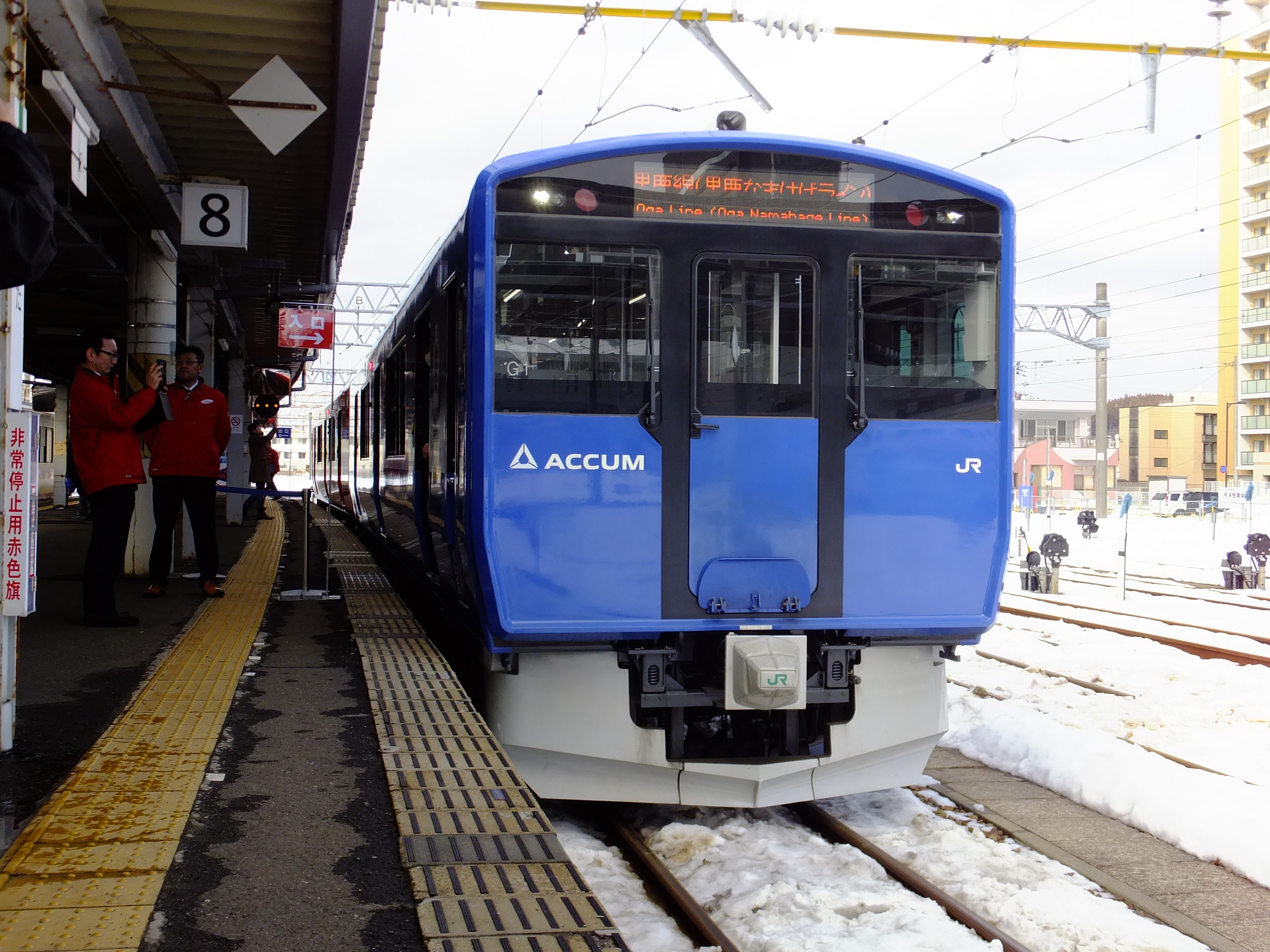
Car EV-E800-1 in February 2017

== Interior ==
Internally, the train uses LED lighting throughout. Seating accommodation consists of longitudinal bench seating. Both cars have a toilet.

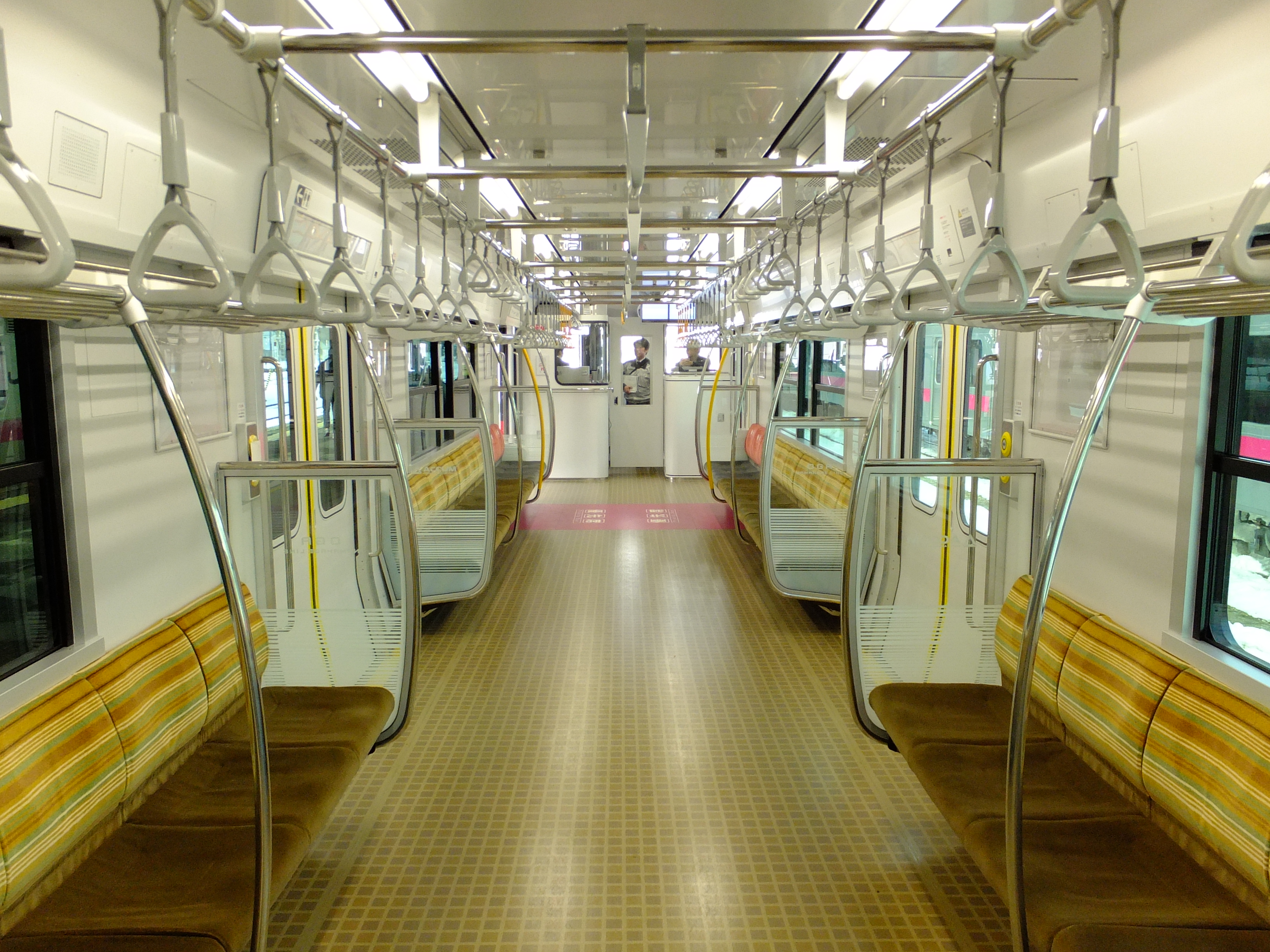
The interior of car EV-E801-1 in February 2017, looking toward the driving end

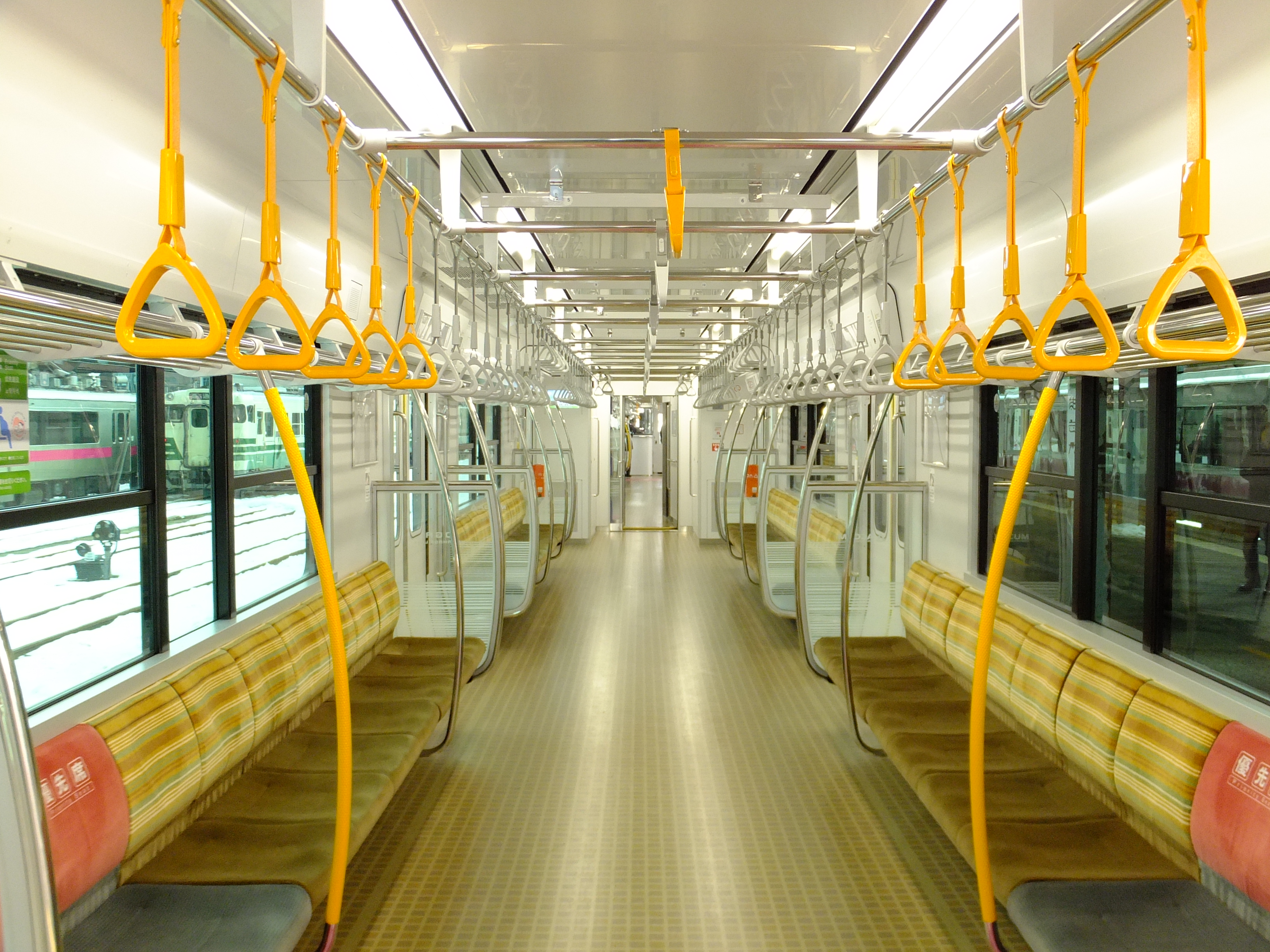
The interior of car EV-E801-1 in February 2017

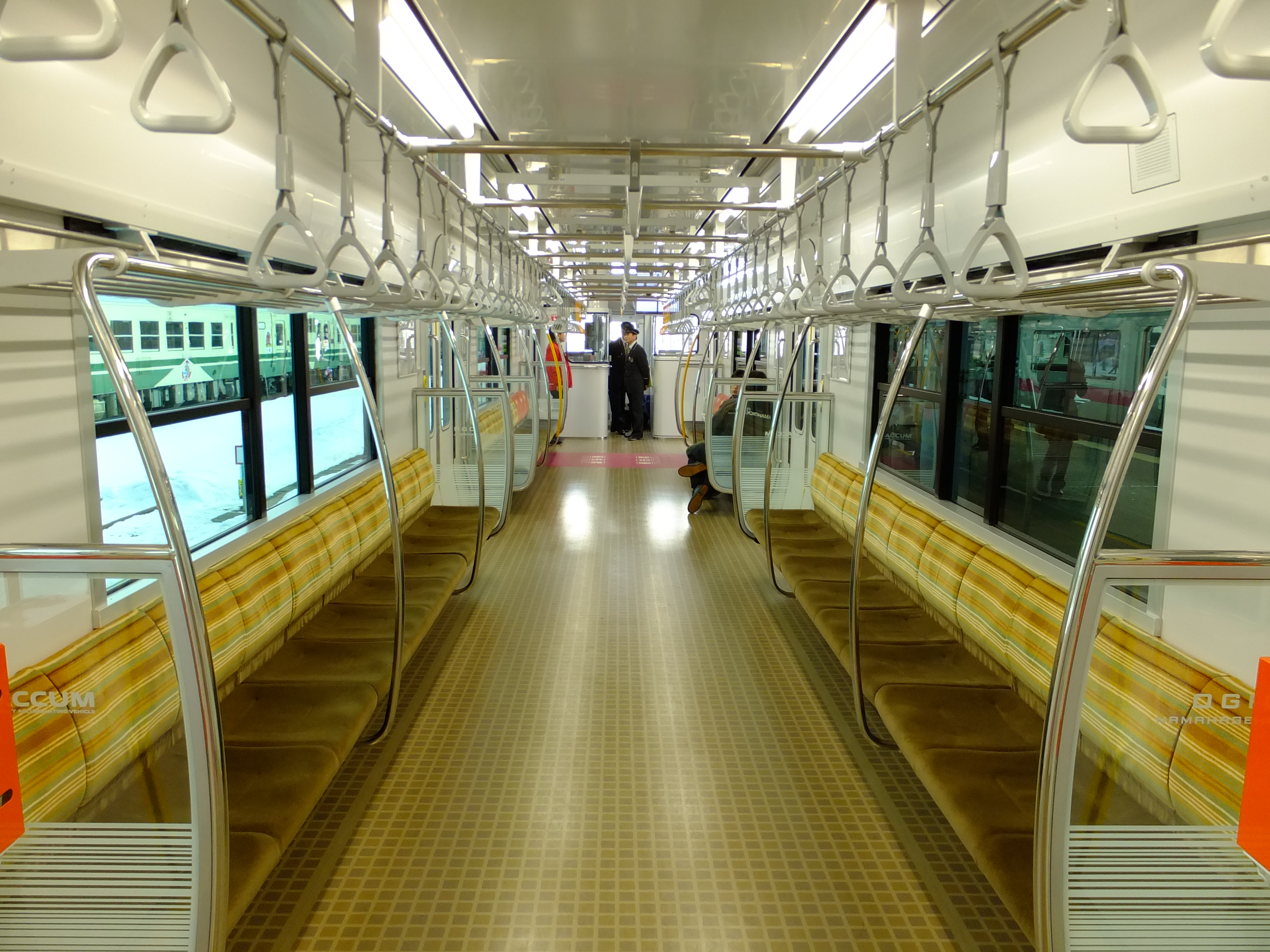
The interior of car EV-E800-1 in February 2017

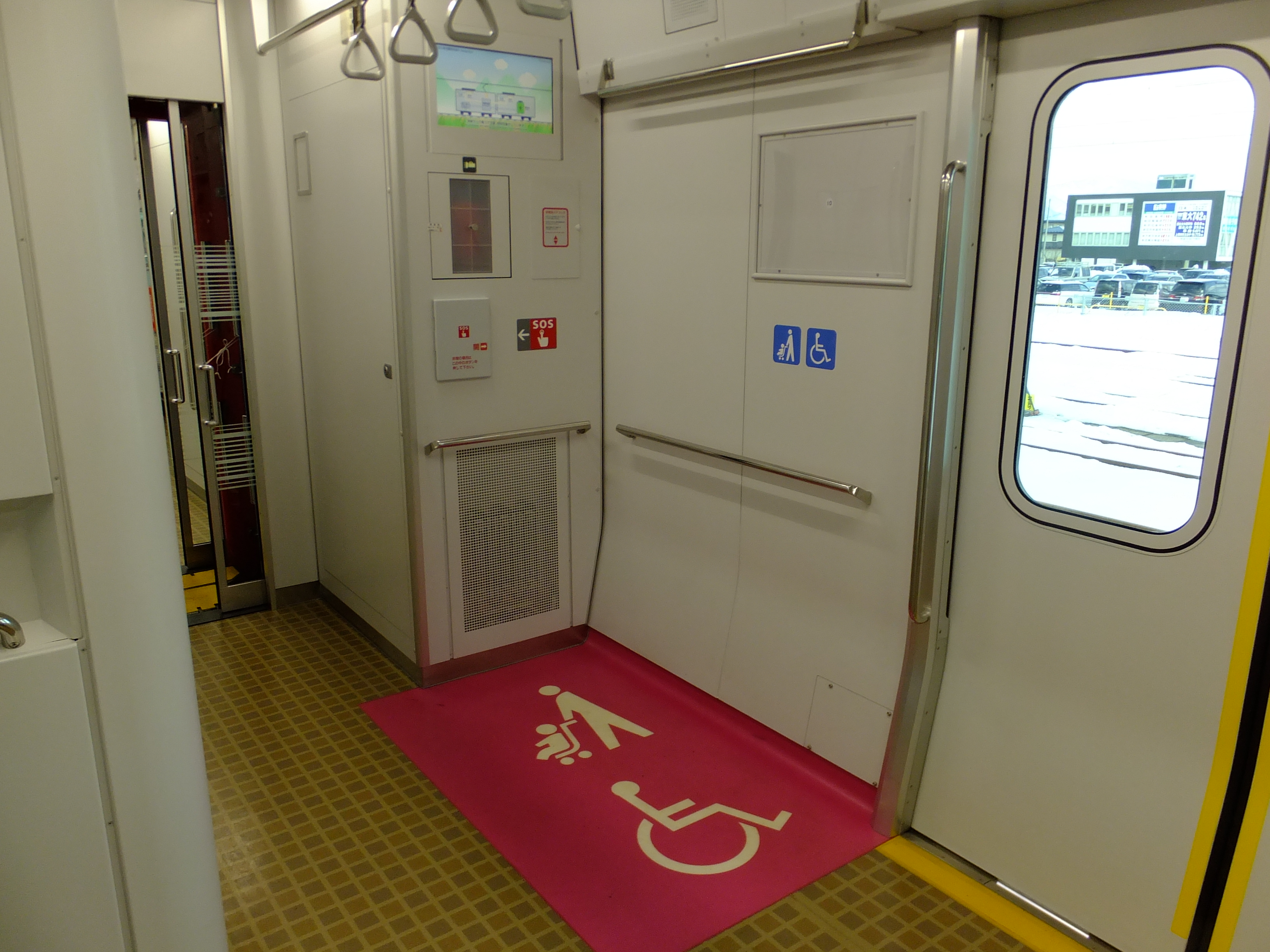
The wheelchair and pushchair space in car EV-E800-1 in February 2017

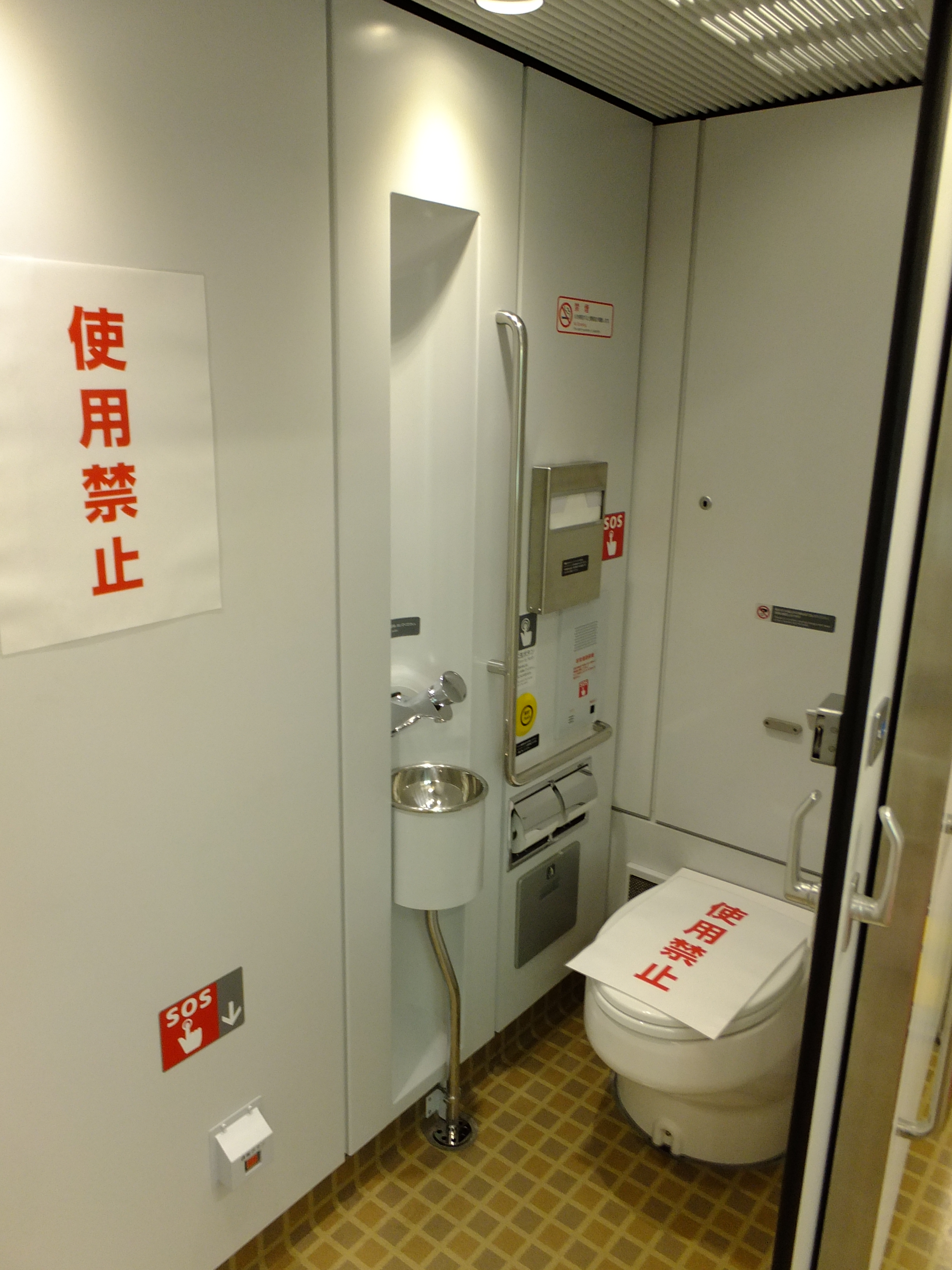
The toilet in car EV-E800-1 in February 2017

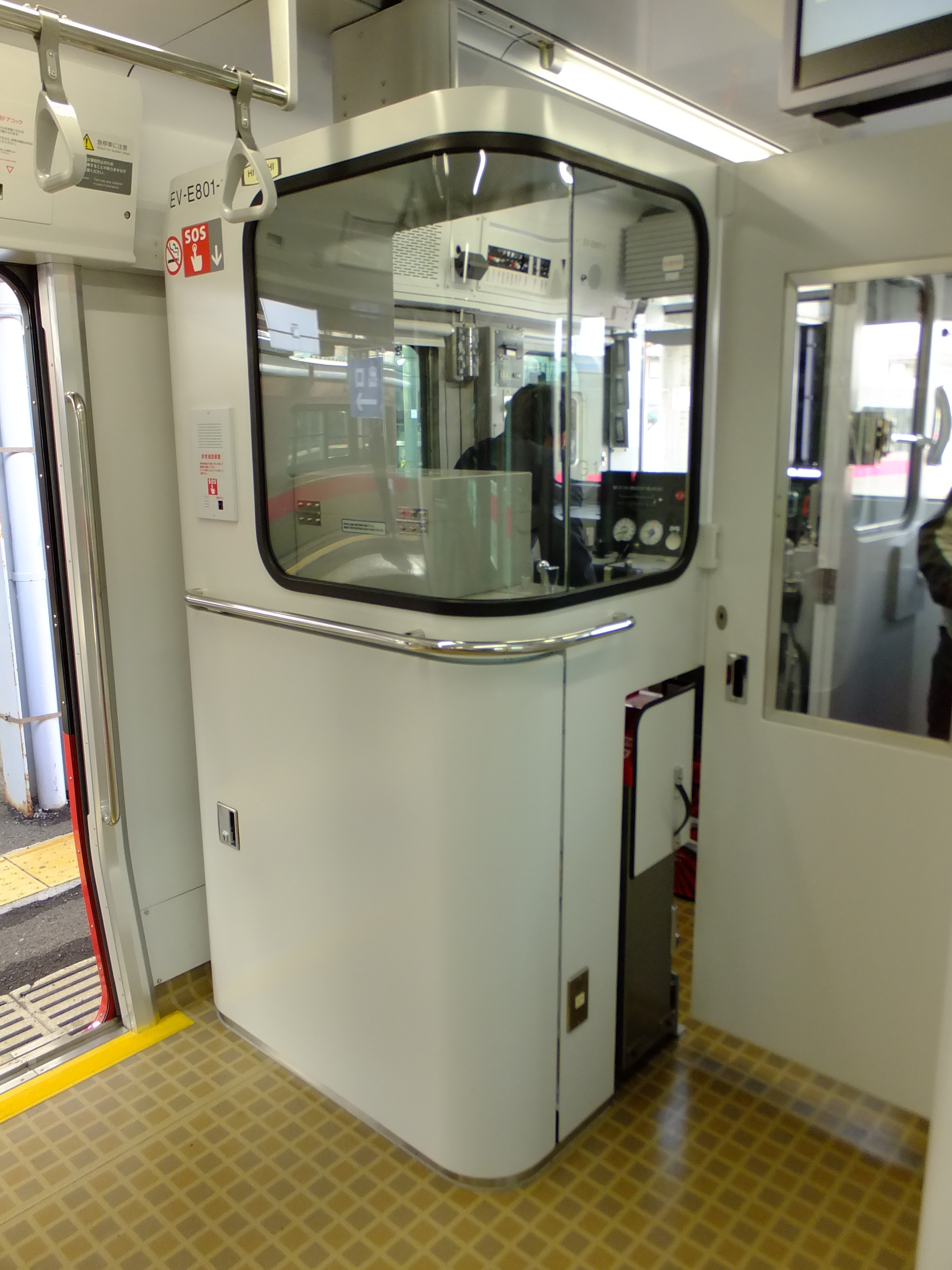
The driving cab of car EV-E801-1 in February 2017

== History ==
Initial details of the new train were formally announced by JR East on 20 November 2015. The train underwent evaluation and proving trials on the Oga Line prior to scheduled services in March 2017. The two-car trainset was delivered from the Hitachi factory in Kudamatsu, Yamaguchi to Akita Depot in December 2016.

On November 2, 2020, two new sets G2 and G3 were delivered from Hitachi and arrived at Akita depot on November 4. The sets were coupled to each other and transported by a freight locomotive. Additionally on November 16, 2020, three more sets G4, G5, and G6 were delivered and arrived at Akita depot two days later.

In December 2023, a winter snowstorm stranded sets G5/G6 in the middle of Oga Line at a passing loop station, requiring a DE10 diesel locomotive to rescue both sets at the same time.

== See also ==
- Smart BEST, a self-charging BEMU train developed by Kinki Sharyo in 2012
- EV-E301 series, a DC BEMU introduced by JR East on the Karasuyama Line in 2014
- BEC819 series, an AC BEMU introduced by JR Kyushu in 2016
