= Ōgane Station =

Railway station in Nasukarasuyama, Tochigi Prefecture, Japan

Ōgane Station 大金駅
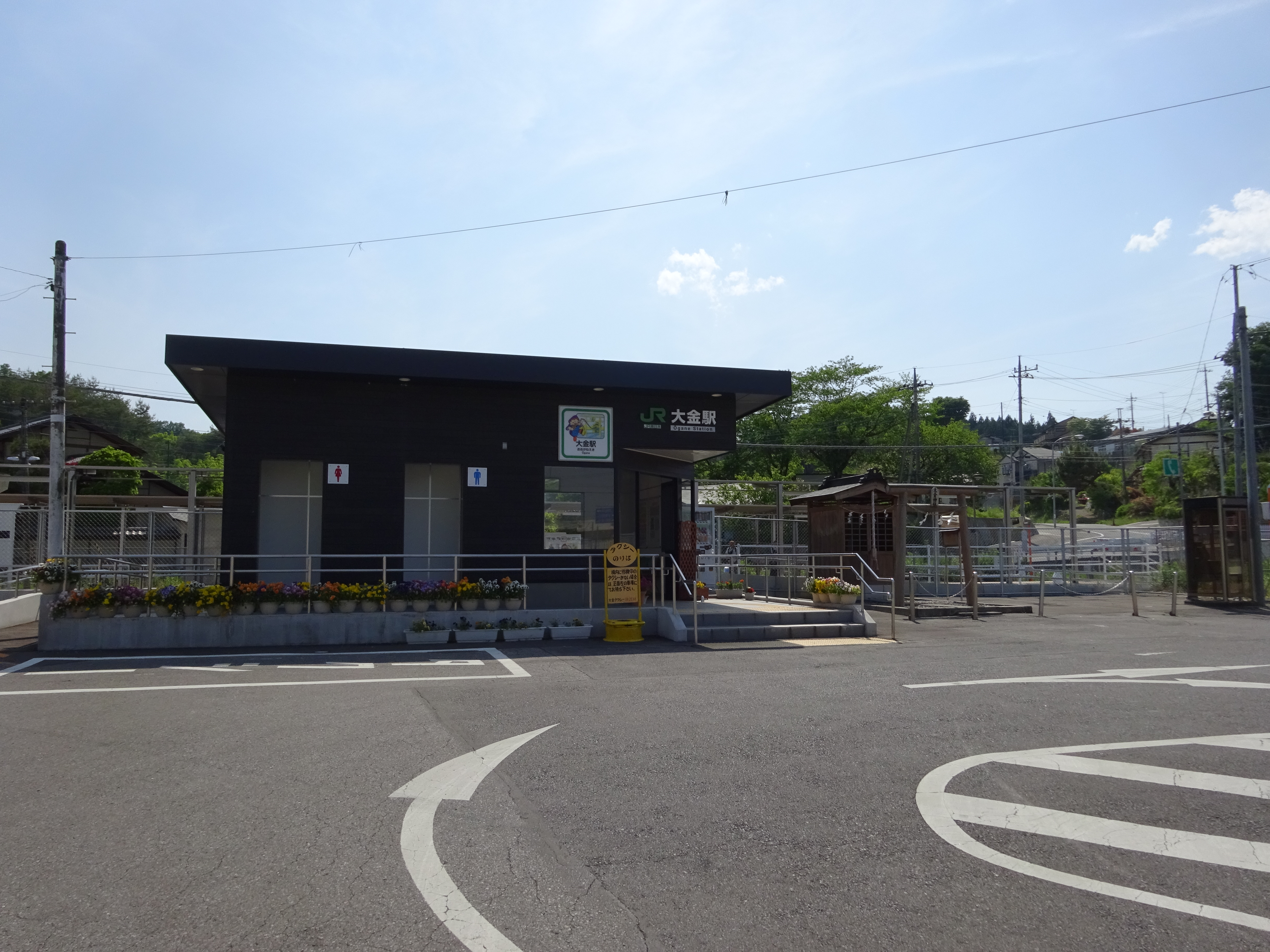
- Ōgane Station, May 2015

General information
- Location: Ōgane, Nasukarasuyama-shi, Tochigi-ken 321-0522; Japan
- Coordinates: 36°39′23.17″N 140°5′44.43″E
- Operator: JR East
- Line: ■ Karasuyama Line
- Distance: 12.7 km from Hōshakuji
- Platforms: 2 side platforms

Other information
- Status: Unstaffed
- Website: Official website

History
- Opened: 15 April 1923

Passengers
- FY2012: 300 daily

Services
Preceding station	JR East	Following station
Kōnoyama towards Utsunomiya	Karasuyama Line	Kobana towards Karasuyama
Location
- Location within Tochigi Prefecture Location within Japan

Ōgane Station (大金駅, Ōgane-eki) is a railway station in the city of Nasukarasuyama, Tochigi, Japan, operated by the East Japan Railway Company (JR East).

== Lines ==
Ōgane Station is served by the Karasuyama Line, a 20.4 km branch line from Hōshakuji to Karasuyama, and is located 12.7 km from Hōshakuji.

== Station layout ==
The station has two opposed side platforms connected to the station building by a level crossing. The station is unattended.

=== Platforms ===
1	■ Karasuyama Line	for Karasuyama
2	■ Karasuyama Line	for Hōshakuji and Utsunomiya

== History ==
The station opened on 15 April 1923.

The station became unstaffed from August 2013, with no facilities available for purchasing tickets.

== Surrounding area ==
- former Minaminasu town hall
- Ōgane Onsen
- Minaminasu Post Office

== See also ==
- List of railway stations in Japan
