= Kōnoyama Station =

Railway station in Nasukarasuyama, Tochigi Prefecture, Japan

Kōnoyama Station 鴻野山駅
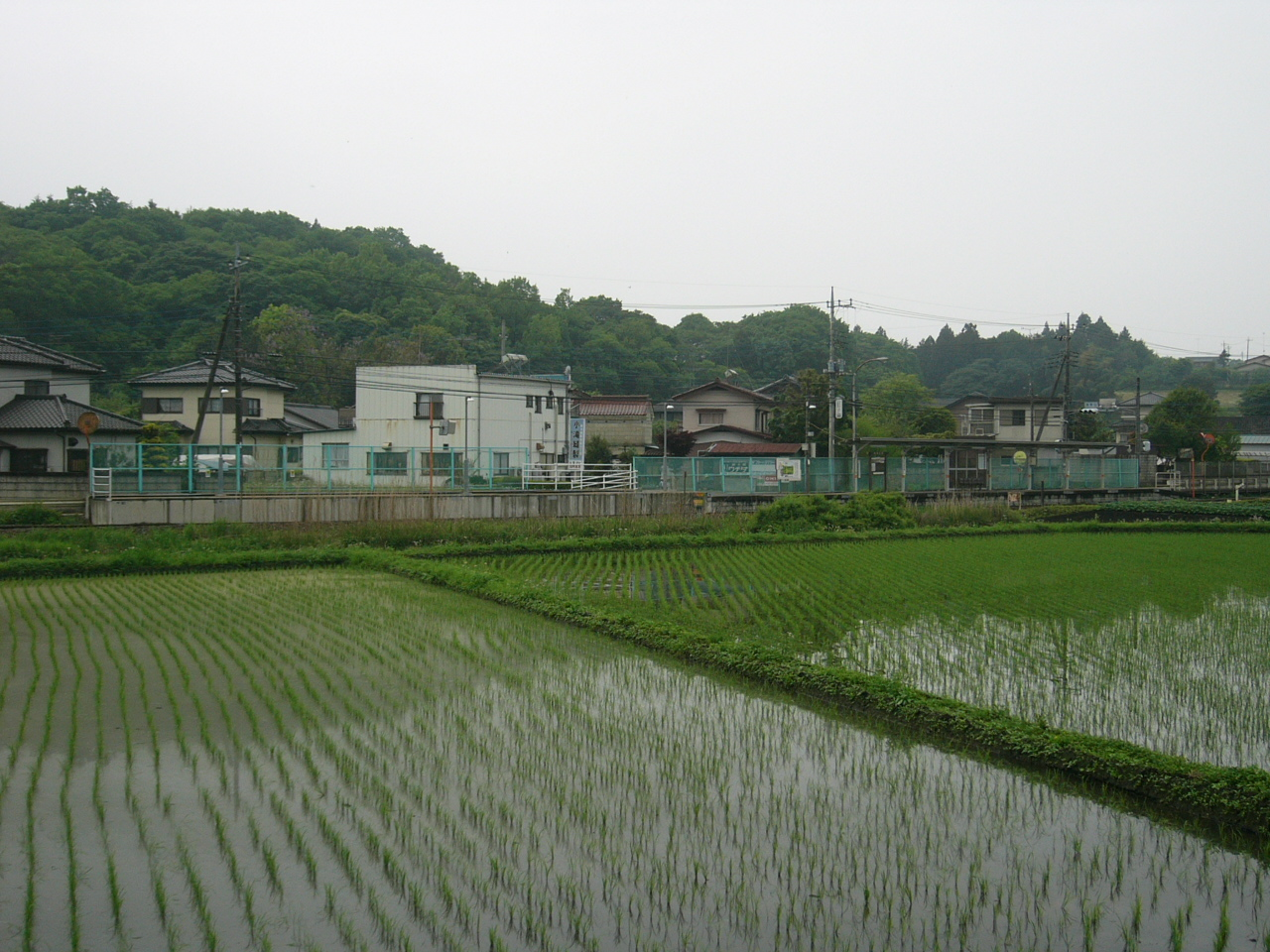
- Kōnoyama Station

General information
- Location: Kōnoyama, Nasukarasuyama-shi, Tochigi-ken 321-0534; Japan
- Coordinates: 36°39′59.26″N 140°3′6.47″E
- Operator: JR East
- Line: ■ Karasuyama Line
- Distance: 8.3 km from Hōshakuji
- Platforms: 1 side platform

Other information
- Status: Unstaffed
- Website: Official website

History
- Opened: 15 August 1934

Passengers
- FY2011: 57 daily

Services
Preceding station	JR East	Following station
Niita towards Utsunomiya	Karasuyama Line	Ōgane towards Karasuyama
Location
- Location within Tochigi Prefecture Location within Japan

Kōnoyama Station (鴻野山駅, Kōnoyama-eki) is a railway station in the city of Nasukarasuyama, Tochigi, Japan, operated by East Japan Railway Company (JR East).

== Lines ==
Kōnoyama Station is served by the Karasuyama Line, a 20.4 km branch line from Hōshakuji to Karasuyama, and is located 8.3 km from Hōshakuji.

== Station layout ==
The station has one side platform serving the single-track line. There is no station building, but only a weather shelter built into the platform. The station is unattended.

== History ==
The station opened on 15 August 1934.

== Surrounding area ==
- Minami-Utsunomiya Country Club
- Nisshin Kogyo

== See also ==
- List of railway stations in Japan
