= Okamoto Station (Tochigi) =

Railway station in Utsunomiya, Tochigi Prefecture, Japan

Okamoto Station 岡本駅
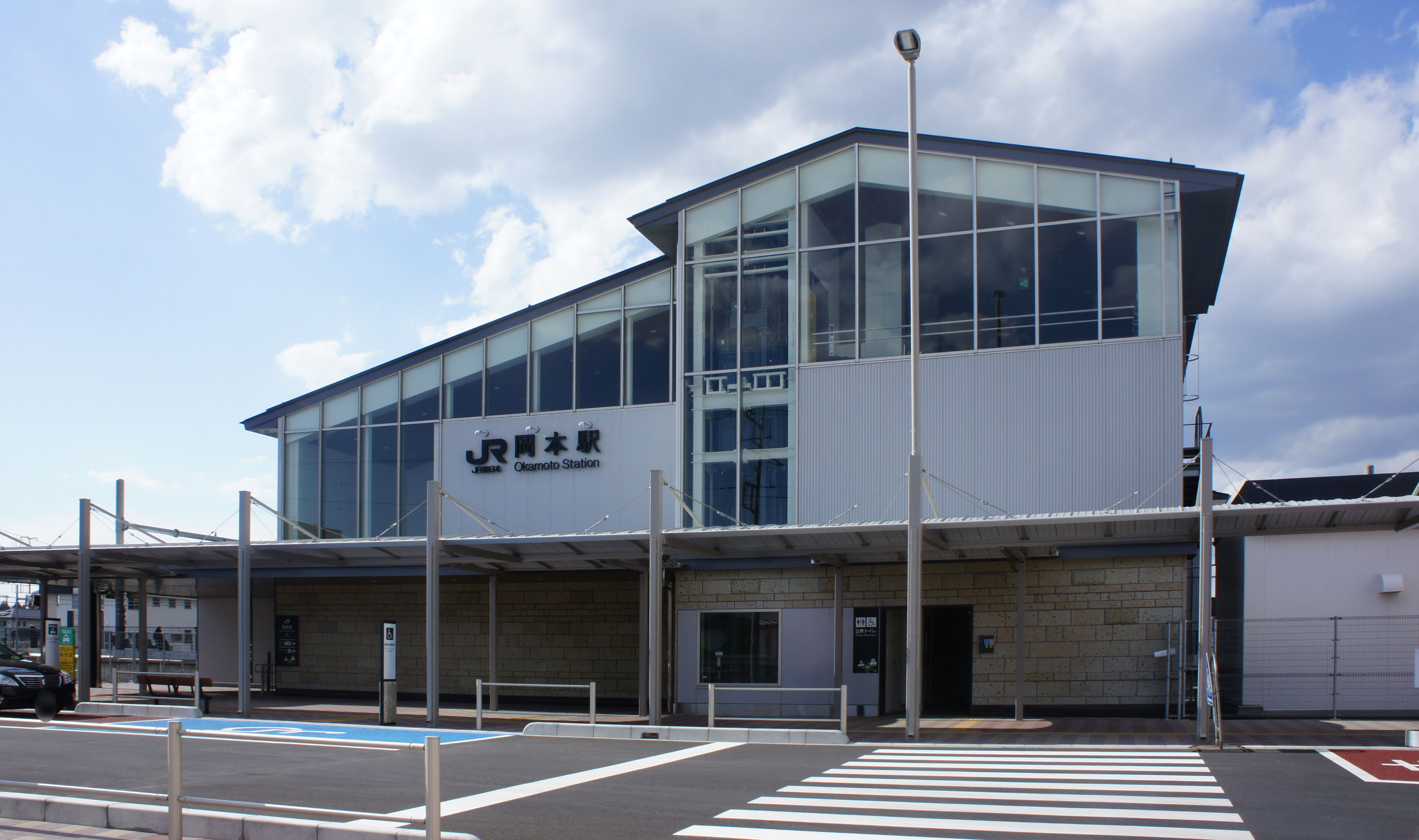
- Okamoto Station, March 2019

General information
- Location: 1986 Shimookamoto, Utsunomiya City, Tochigi Prefecture 329-1104; Japan
- Coordinates: 36°35′54″N 139°56′40″E
- Operator: JR East
- Lines: Tōhoku Main Line; Utsunomiya Line; Karasuyama Line
- Distance: 115.7 km (71.9 mi) from Tokyo
- Platforms: 2 island platforms
- Tracks: 4 (Only 2 in use normally)

Construction
- Structure type: At grade

Other information
- Status: Staffed
- Website: Official website

History
- Opened: 25 February 1897; 129 years ago

Passengers
- FY2019: 2,704

Services
Preceding station	JR East	Following station
Utsunomiya towards Tokyo	Utsunomiya Line Local	Hōshakuji towards Kuroiso
Utsunomiya Terminus	Karasuyama Line	Hōshakuji towards Karasuyama
Location
- Location within Tochigi Prefecture Location within Kanto Area Location within Japan

Okamoto Station (岡本駅, Okamoto-eki) is a railway station in the city of Utsunomiya, Tochigi, Japan, operated by the East Japan Railway Company (JR East).

== Lines ==
Okamoto Station is served by the Utsunomiya Line (Tohoku Main Line), and lies 115.7 km from the starting point of the line at Tokyo. Through services on the Karasuyama Line past its official terminus at Hōshakuji and Utsunomiya are also provided.

== Station layout ==
This station has two island platforms connected to the station building by a footbridge; however, only one side of each platform is in use. The station is staffed.

=== Platforms ===
2	■ Utsunomiya Line (Ueno-Tokyo Line)	for Utsunomiya, Ōmiya, Ueno, Tokyo, Yokohama, Atami (via Tokaido Line)
2	■ Karasuyama Line	for Utsunomiya
4	■ Utsunomiya Line	for Nasushiobara and Kuroiso
4	■ Karasuyama Line	for Niita and Karasuyama

== History ==
Okamoto Station opened on 25 February 1897. With the privatization of JNR on 1 April 1987, the station came under the control of JR East.

== Passenger statistics ==
In fiscal 2019, the station was used by an average of 2704 passengers daily (boarding passengers only).

== Surrounding area ==
- National Route 4
- Hirade Industrial Park

== See also ==
- List of railway stations in Japan
