= Kobana Station =

Railway station in Nasukarasuyama, Tochigi Prefecture, Japan

Kobana Station 小塙駅
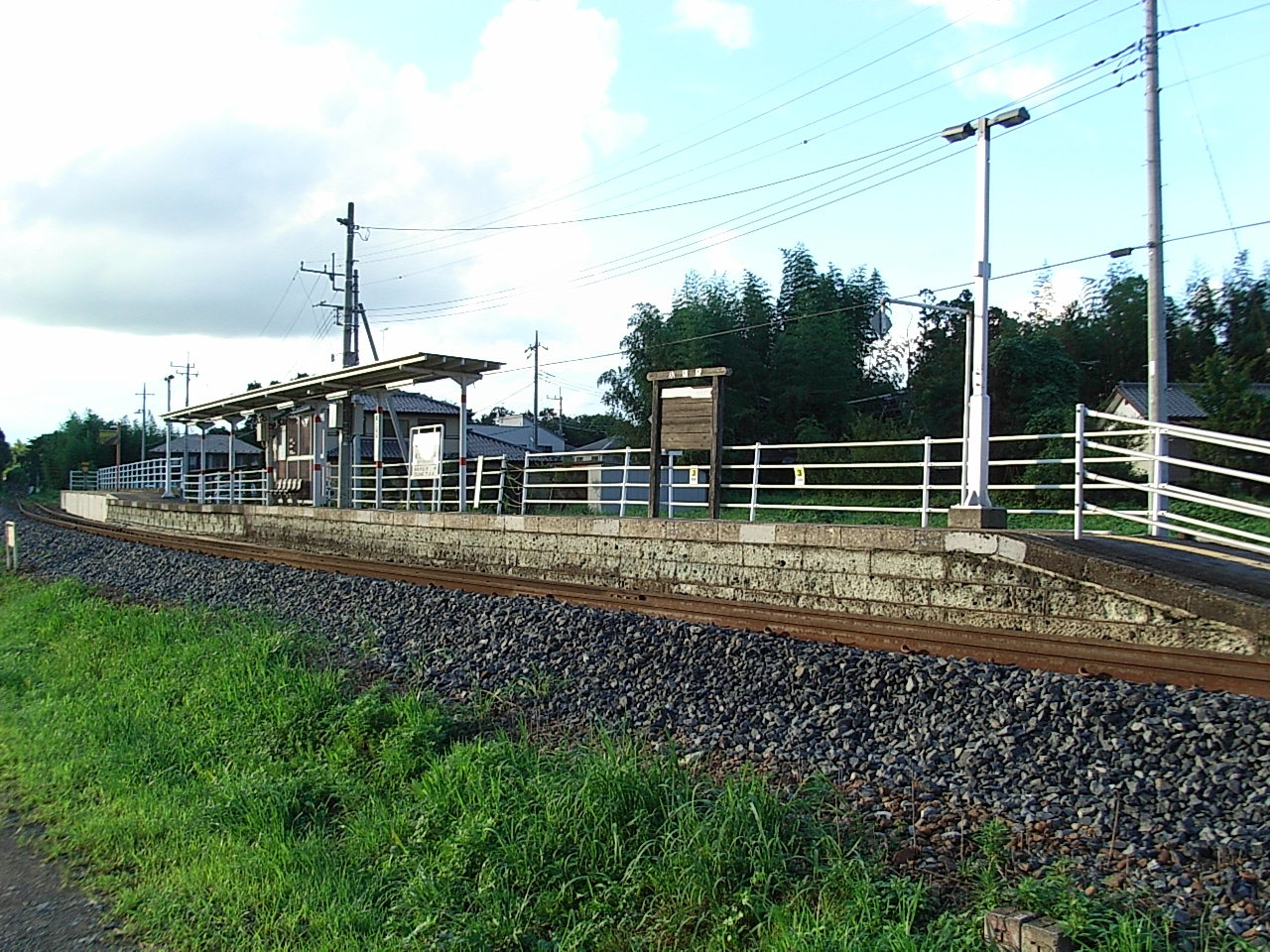
- Kobana Station in August 2008

General information
- Location: Kobana, Nasukarasuyama-shi, Tochigi-ken 321-0513; Japan
- Coordinates: 36°38′33.98″N 140°7′1.15″E
- Operator: JR East
- Line: ■ Karasuyama Line
- Distance: 15.3 km from Hōshakuji
- Platforms: 1 side platform

Other information
- Status: Unstaffed
- Website: Official website

History
- Opened: 15 August 1934

Passengers
- FY2011: 4 daily

Services
Preceding station	JR East	Following station
Ōgane towards Utsunomiya	Karasuyama Line	Taki towards Karasuyama
Location
- Location within Tochigi Prefecture Location within Japan

Kobana Station (小塙駅, Kobana-eki) is a railway station in the city of Nasukarasuyama, Tochigi, Japan, operated by the East Japan Railway Company (JR East).

== Lines ==
Kobana Station is served by the Karasuyama Line, a 20.4-kilometre (12.7 mi) branch line from Hōshakuji to Karasuyama, and is located 15.3 kilometres (9.5 mi) from Hōshakuji.

== History ==
The station opened on 15 August 1934.

== See also ==
- List of railway stations in Japan
