= Taki Station (Tochigi) =

Railway station in Nasukarasuyama, Tochigi Prefecture, Japan

Taki Station 滝駅
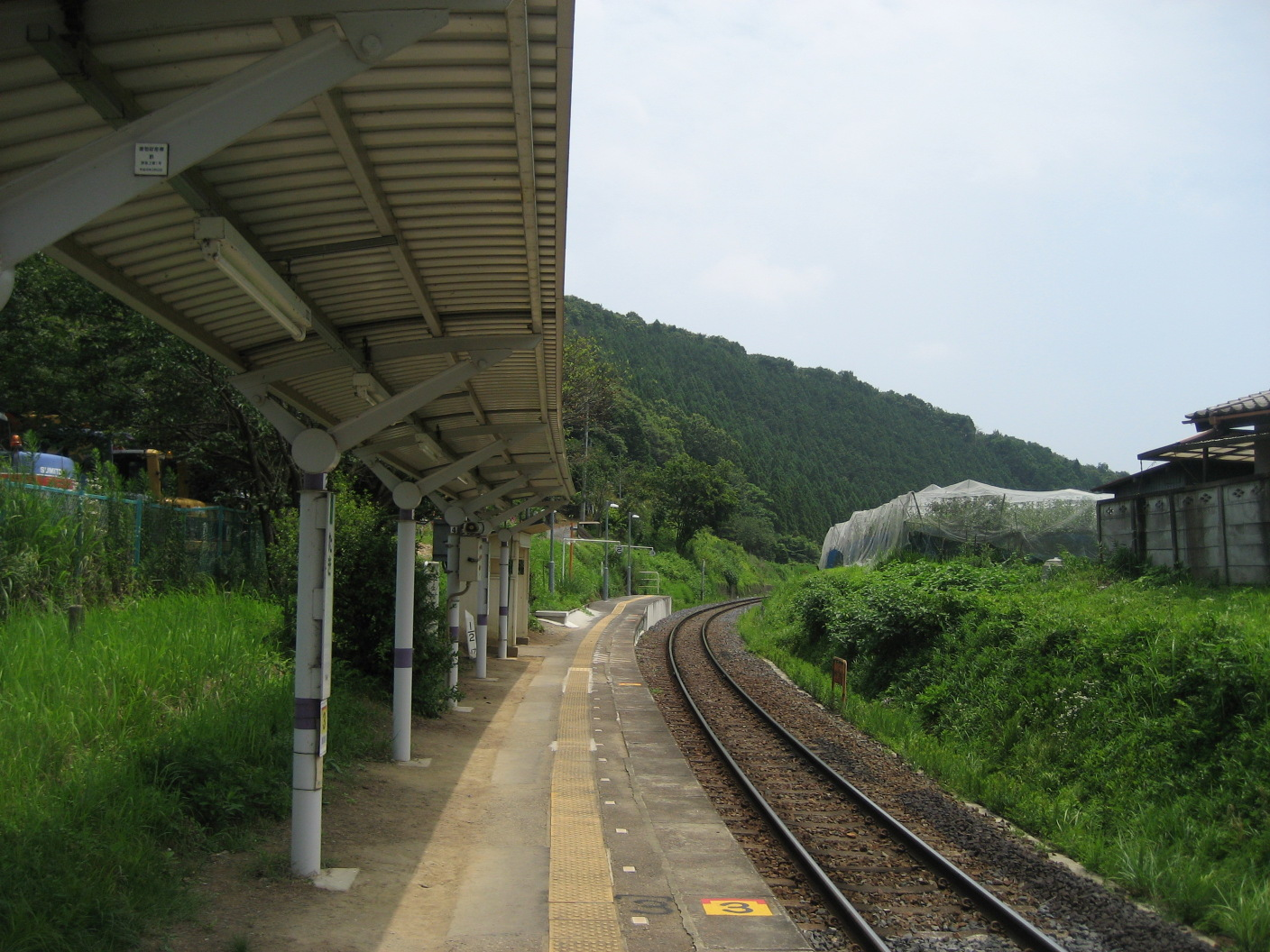
- Taki Station, August 2008

General information
- Location: Taki, Nasukarasuyama-shi, Tochigi-ken 321-0633; Japan
- Coordinates: 36°38′55.64″N 140°8′16.87″E
- Operator: JR East
- Line: ■ Karasuyama Line
- Distance: 17.5 km from Hōshakuji
- Platforms: 1 side platform

Other information
- Status: Unstaffed
- Website: Official website

History
- Opened: 1 June 1954

Passengers
- FY2011: 4 daily

Services
Preceding station	JR East	Following station
Kobana towards Utsunomiya	Karasuyama Line	Karasuyama Terminus
Location
- Location within Tochigi Prefecture Location within Japan

Taki Station (滝駅, Taki-eki) is a railway station in the city of Nasukarasuyama, Tochigi, Japan, operated by the East Japan Railway Company (JR East).

== Lines ==
Taki Station is served by the Karasuyama Line, a 20.4 km branch line from Hōshakuji to Karasuyama, and is located 17.5 km from Hōshakuji.

== Station layout ==
The station consists of one side platform serving a single track. There is no station building. The station is unattended.

== History ==
The station opened on 1 June 1954.

== Surrounding area ==
- Ryumon-no-taki waterfalls
- Taihei-ji

== See also ==
- List of railway stations in Japan
