= Shimotsuke-Hanaoka Station =

Railway station in Takanezawa, Tochigi Prefecture, Japan

Shimotsuke-Hanaoka Station 下野花岡駅
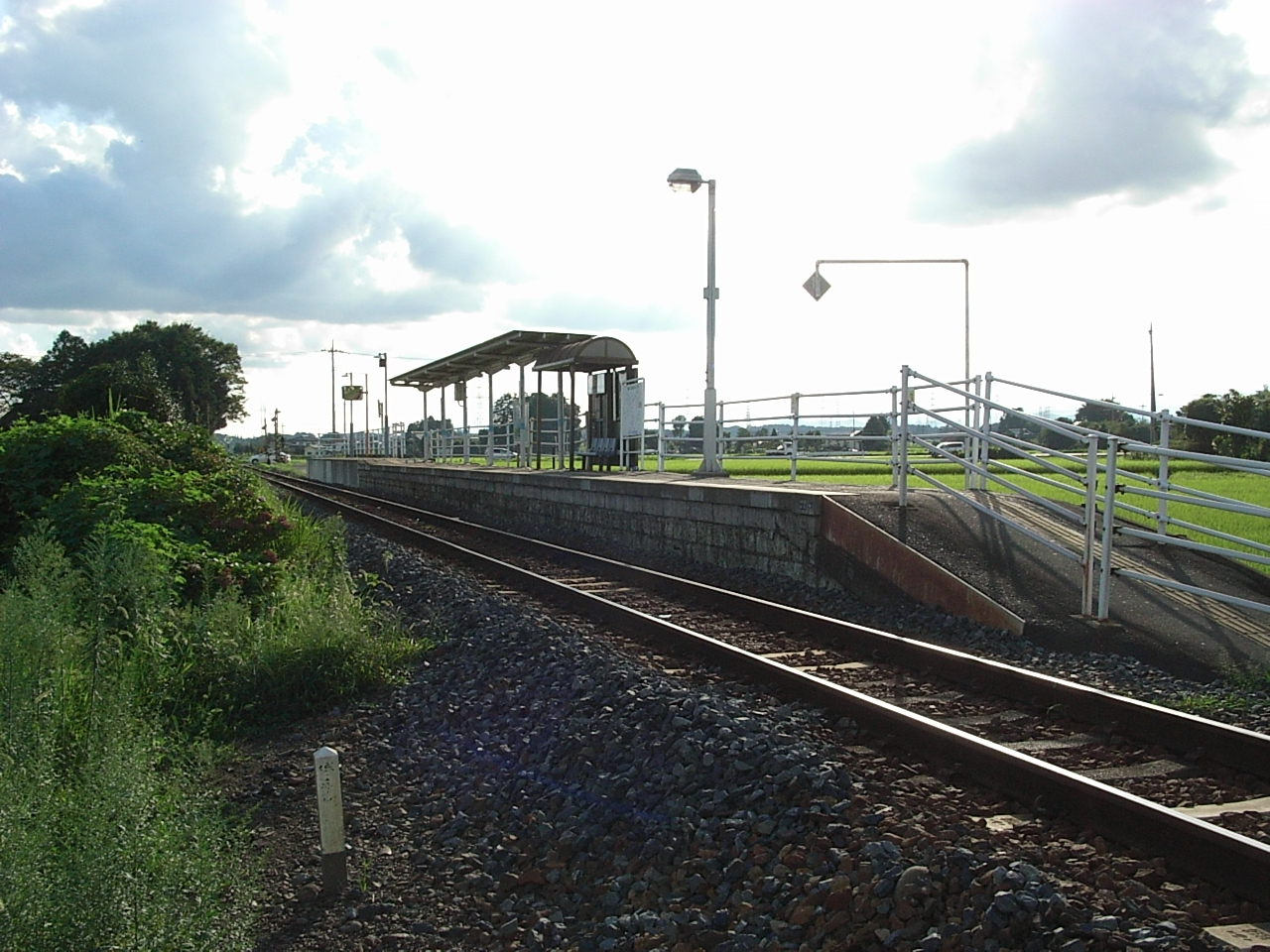
- Shimotsuke-Hanaoka Station in August 2008

General information
- Location: Hanaoka, Takanezawa Town, Shioya District, Tochigi Prefecture 329-1207; Japan
- Coordinates: 36°38′59.68″N 140°0′31.26″E
- Operator: JR East
- Line: Karasuyama Line
- Distance: 3.9 km (2.4 mi) from Hōshakuji
- Platforms: 1 side platform
- Tracks: 1

Construction
- Structure type: At grade

Other information
- Status: Unstaffed
- Website: Official website

History
- Opened: 15 August 1934; 92 years ago

Passengers
- FY2011: 43 daily

Services
Preceding station	JR East	Following station
Hōshakuji towards Utsunomiya	Karasuyama Line	Niita towards Karasuyama
Location
- Location within Tochigi Prefecture Location within Kanto Area Location within Japan

Shimotsuke-Hanaoka Station (下野花岡駅, Shimotsuke-Hanaoka-eki) is a railway station in the town of Takanezawa, Tochigi, Japan, operated by the East Japan Railway Company (JR East).

== Lines ==
Shimotsuke-Hanaoka Station is served by the Karasuyama Line, a 20.4 km branch line from Hōshakuji to Karasuyama, and is located 3.9 km from Hōshakuji.

== Station layout ==
The station consists of one side platform serving a single track. There is no station building. The station is unattended.

== History ==
The station opened on 15 August 1934.

== Surrounding area ==
- Sugamata Hospital

== See also ==
- List of railway stations in Japan
