= Okamoto Station =

Okamoto Station can refer to three different train stations in Japan:

- Okamoto Station (Hyōgo), on the Hankyu Kobe Line in Higashinada-ku, Kobe, Japan
- Okamoto Station (Kagawa), on the Takamatsu-Kotohira Electric Railroad Kotohira Line in Takamatsu, Kagawa, Japan
- Okamoto Station (Tochigi), on the Tōhoku Main Line in Kawachi, Tochigi, Japan
