= Niita Station =

Railway station in Takanezawa, Tochigi Prefecture, Japan

Niita Station 仁井田駅
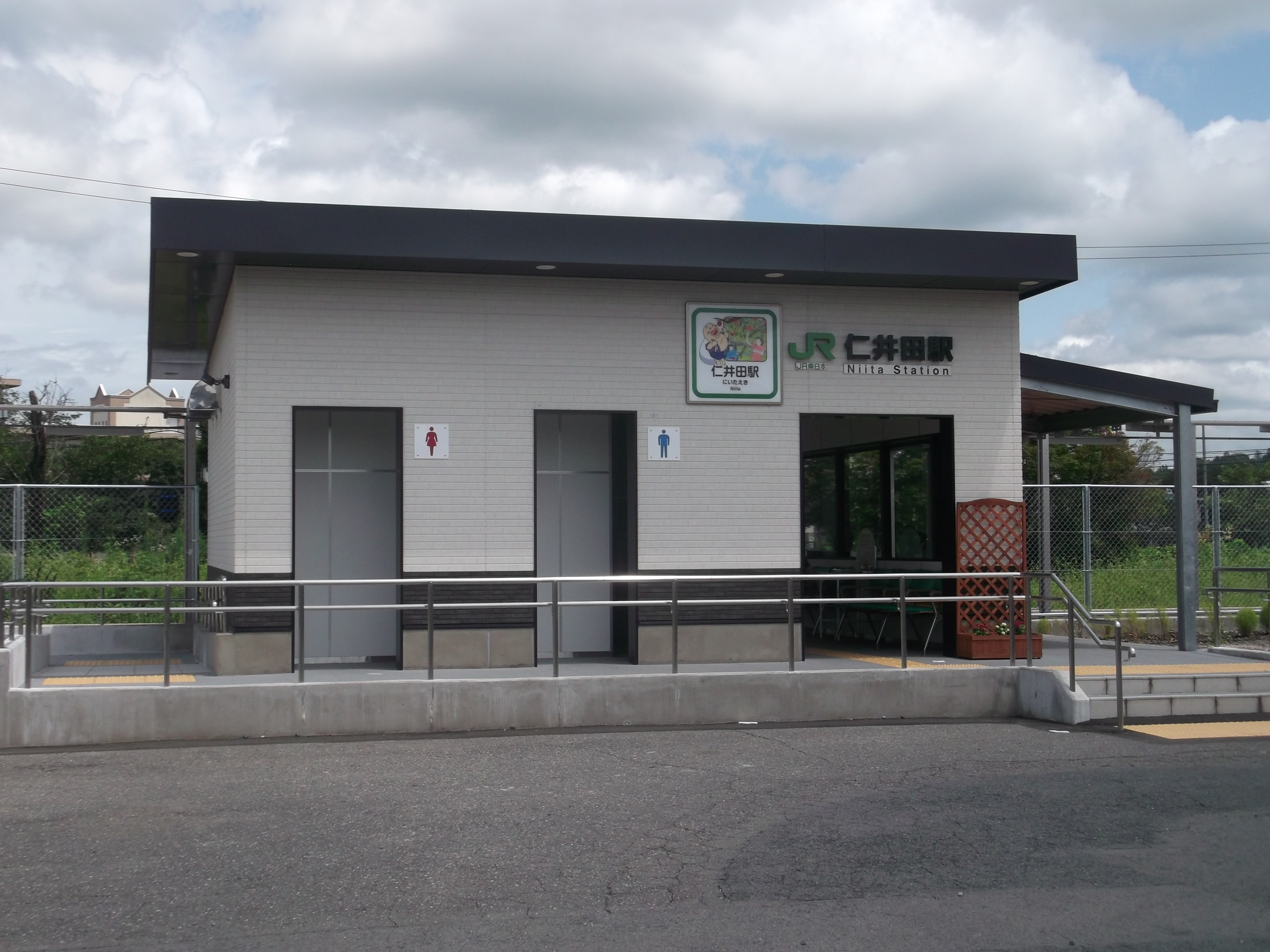
- Niita Station, July 2014

General information
- Location: Fubasami, Takanezawa-machi, Shioya-gun, Tochigi-ken 329-120; Japan
- Coordinates: 36°39′26.19″N 140°1′46.99″E
- Operator: JR East
- Line: ■ Karasuyama Line
- Distance: 5.9 km from Hōshakuji
- Platforms: 1 side platform

Other information
- Status: Unstaffed
- Website: Official website

History
- Opened: 15 April 1923

Passengers
- FY2011: 435 daily

Services
| Preceding station | JR East | Following station |
|---|---|---|
| Shimotsuke-Hanaoka towards Utsunomiya | Karasuyama Line | Kōnoyama towards Karasuyama |
Location
- Location within Tochigi Prefecture Location within Japan

Niita Station (仁井田駅, Niita-eki) is a railway station in the town of Takanezawa, Tochigi, Japan, operated by the East Japan Railway Company (JR East).

== Lines ==
Niita Station is served by the Karasuyama Line, a 20.4 km (12.7 mi) branch line from Hōshakuji to Karasuyama, and is located 5.9 km (3.7 mi) from Hōshakuji.

== Station layout ==
The station consists of one side platform serving a single track. The station is unattended.

== History ==
The station opened on 15 April 1923 as Niita Station (熟田駅). The kanji of its name was changed to the present spelling on 1 April 1925. A new station building was completed in March 2014.

== Surrounding area ==
- Niita Post Office

== See also ==
- List of railway stations in Japan
