= NE Train =

Experimental Japanese train

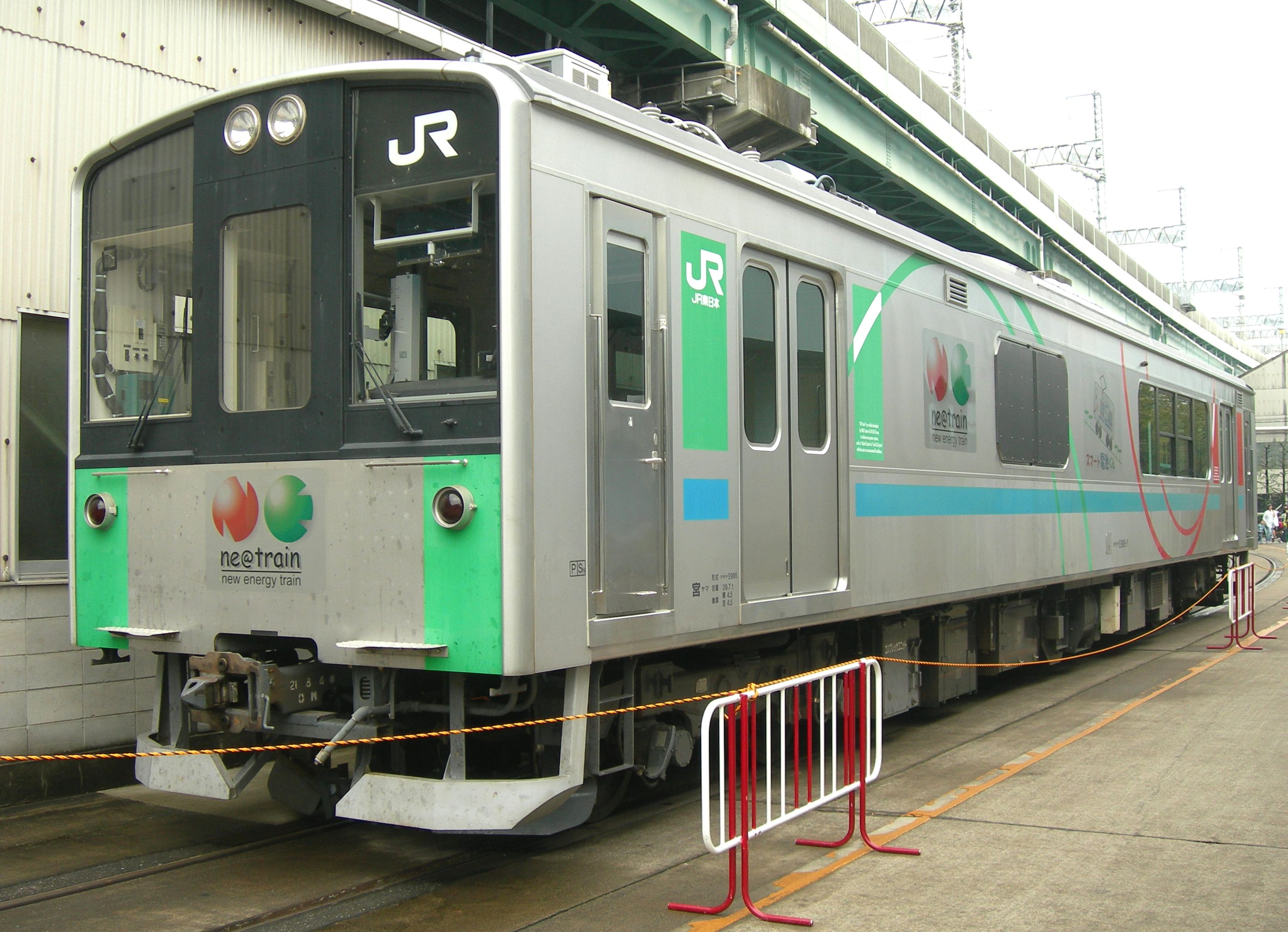
- KuMoYa E995-1 "NE Train Smart Denchi-kun" in October 2011
- Manufacturer: Tokyu Car Corporation
- Constructed: 2003
- Scrapped: 2020
- Number built: 1 vehicle
- Formation: Single car
- Capacity: Non-passenger
- Operator: JR East

Specifications
- Car body construction: Stainless steel
- Car length: 20,000 mm (65 ft 7 in)
- Width: 2,800 mm (9 ft 2 in)
- Height: 3,655 mm (11 ft 11.9 in)
- Doors: 2 pairs per side
- Maximum speed: 100 km/h (62 mph)
- Electric system: 1,500 V DC
- Current collection: Overhead catenary
- Track gauge: 1,067 mm (3 ft 6 in)

The "NE Train" (NEトレイン) (New Energy Train) was an experimental railcar which was used to test multiple alternative power sources by the Railway Technical Research Institute (RTRI) and East Japan Railway Company (JR East) in Japan from 2003 to 2022.

== History ==
=== KiYa E991 diesel/battery hybrid railcar ===
The "NE Train" was first delivered from Tokyu Car Corporation in April 2003, configured as the world's first hybrid diesel/battery railcar and classified as KiYa E991-1. The stainless steel bodyshell was derived from the E127-100 series EMU design, although with cabs at both ends instead of one in a married pair, two doors per side instead of three, and no gangways. From 6 May 2003, it was tested on the Nikkō and Karasuyama Lines. Data obtained from these trials was used to develop the KiHa E200 DMU, which entered service on the Koumi Line from July 2007. The train used small lithium-ion batteries and high powered cells as would be used in a hybrid automobile.

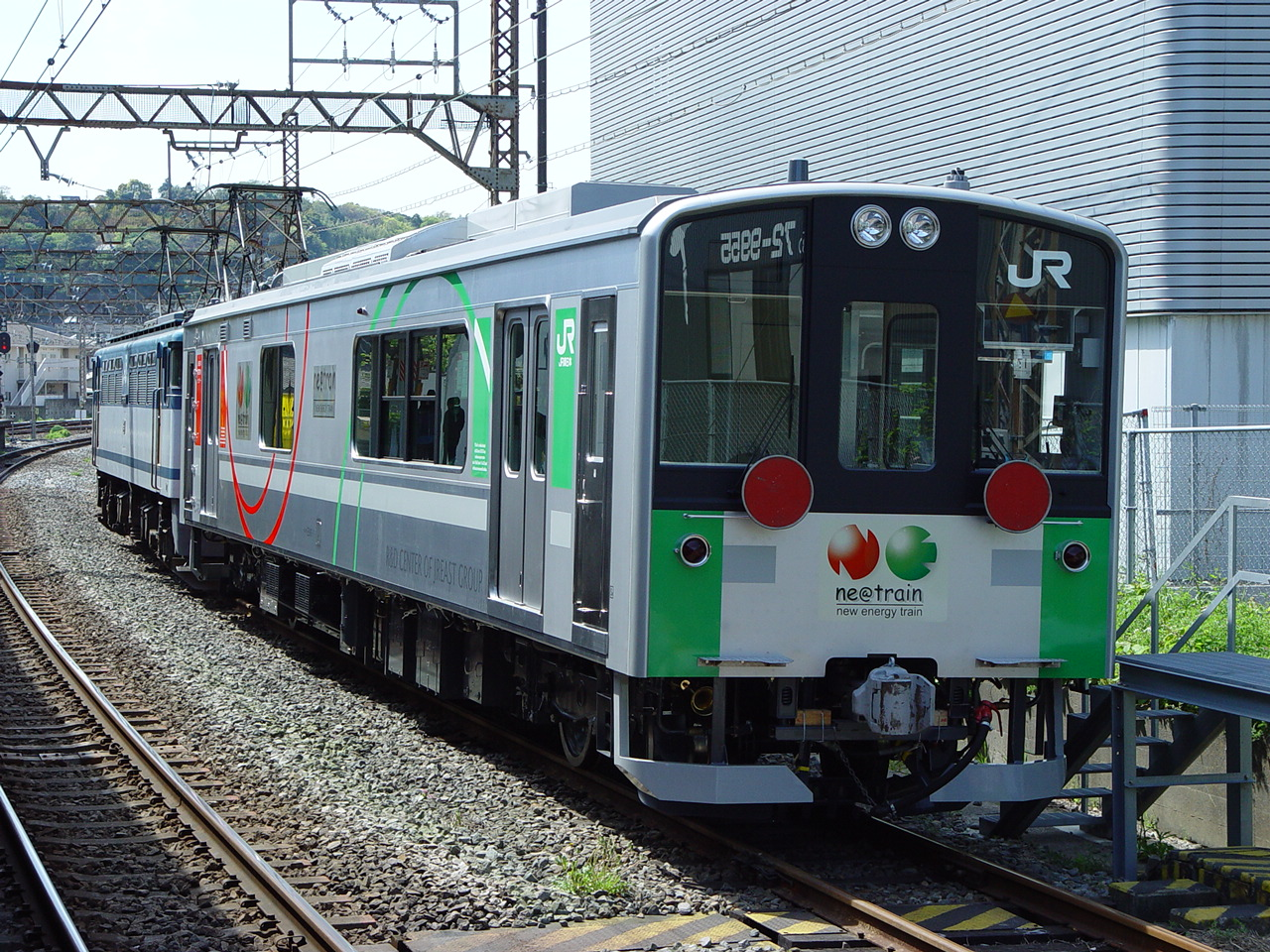
The KiYa E991-1 "NE Train" on delivery in April 2003

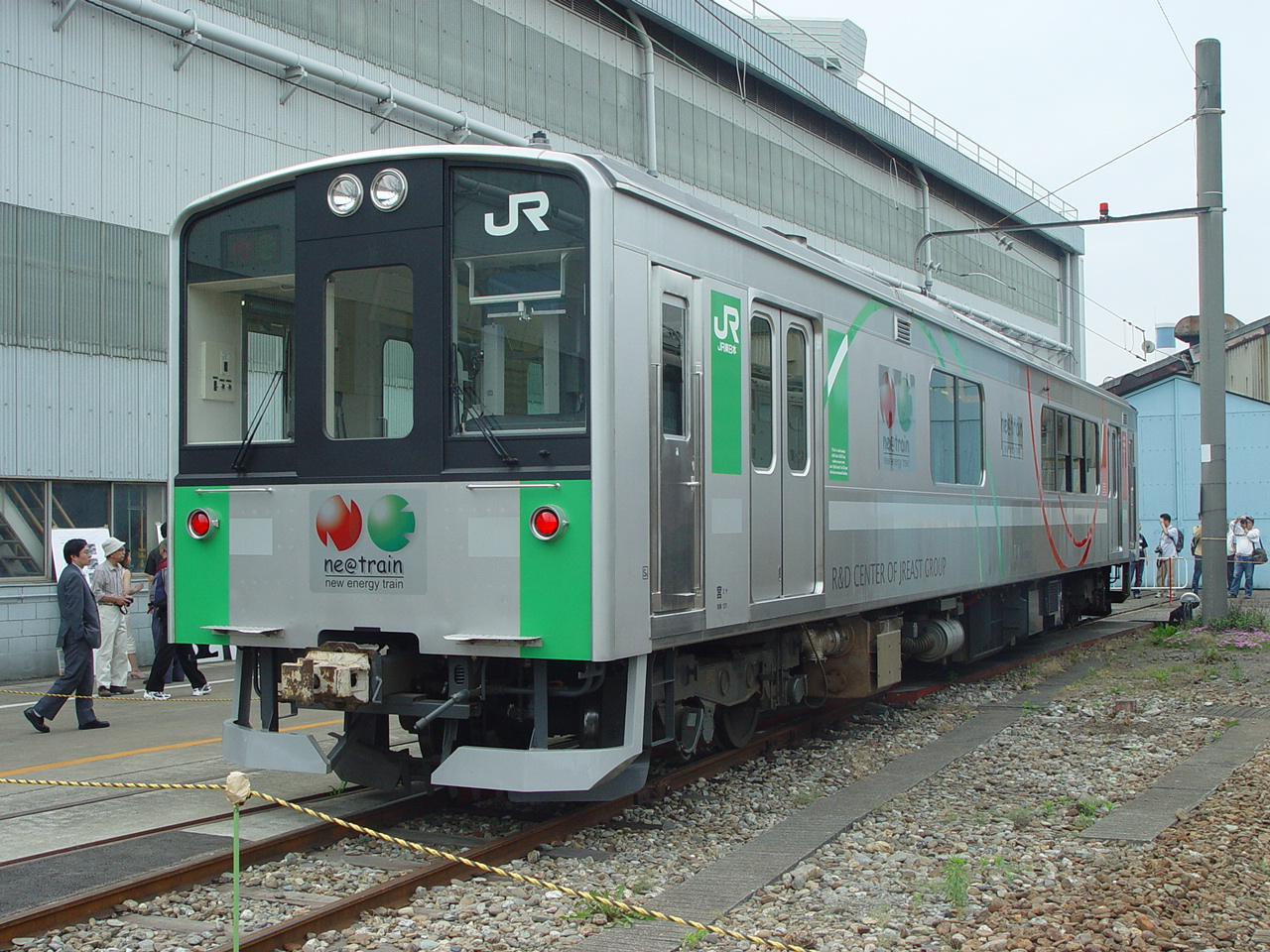
"NE Train" in its first incarnation as diesel/battery hybrid KiYa E991-1 in May 2004

=== KuMoYa E995 fuel-cell/battery hybrid railcar ===
The "NE Train" underwent modifications in 2006 to replace the diesel generator with a hydrogen fuel cell, becoming the world's first fuel-cell/battery hybrid railway vehicle, classified KuMoYa E995-1. The vehicle was fitted with six hydrogen tanks (with total capacity of 270 L (71 U.S. gal)) and lithium-ion batteries with increased storage capacity (19 kWh) compared with the earlier KiYa E991 hybrid version. These powered the train's two 95 kW (127 hp) traction motors. The railcar was based at Nagano depot, and tested on JR East main lines in the Nagano area during fiscal year 2007 at speeds of up to 100 km/h (62 mph).

=== KuMoYa E995 series battery railcar ===
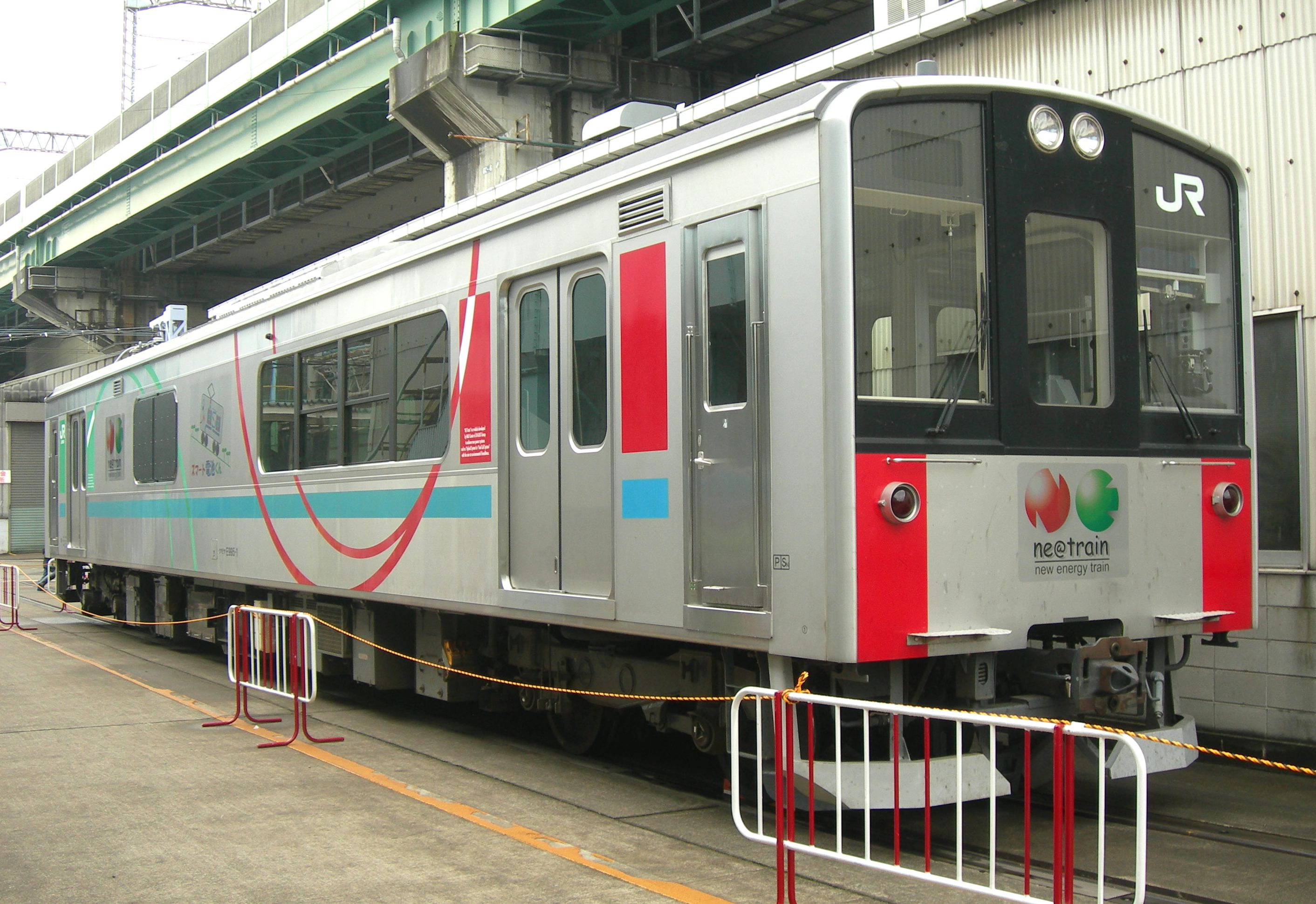
KuMoYa E995-1 "NE Train Smart Denchi-kun" in October 2011

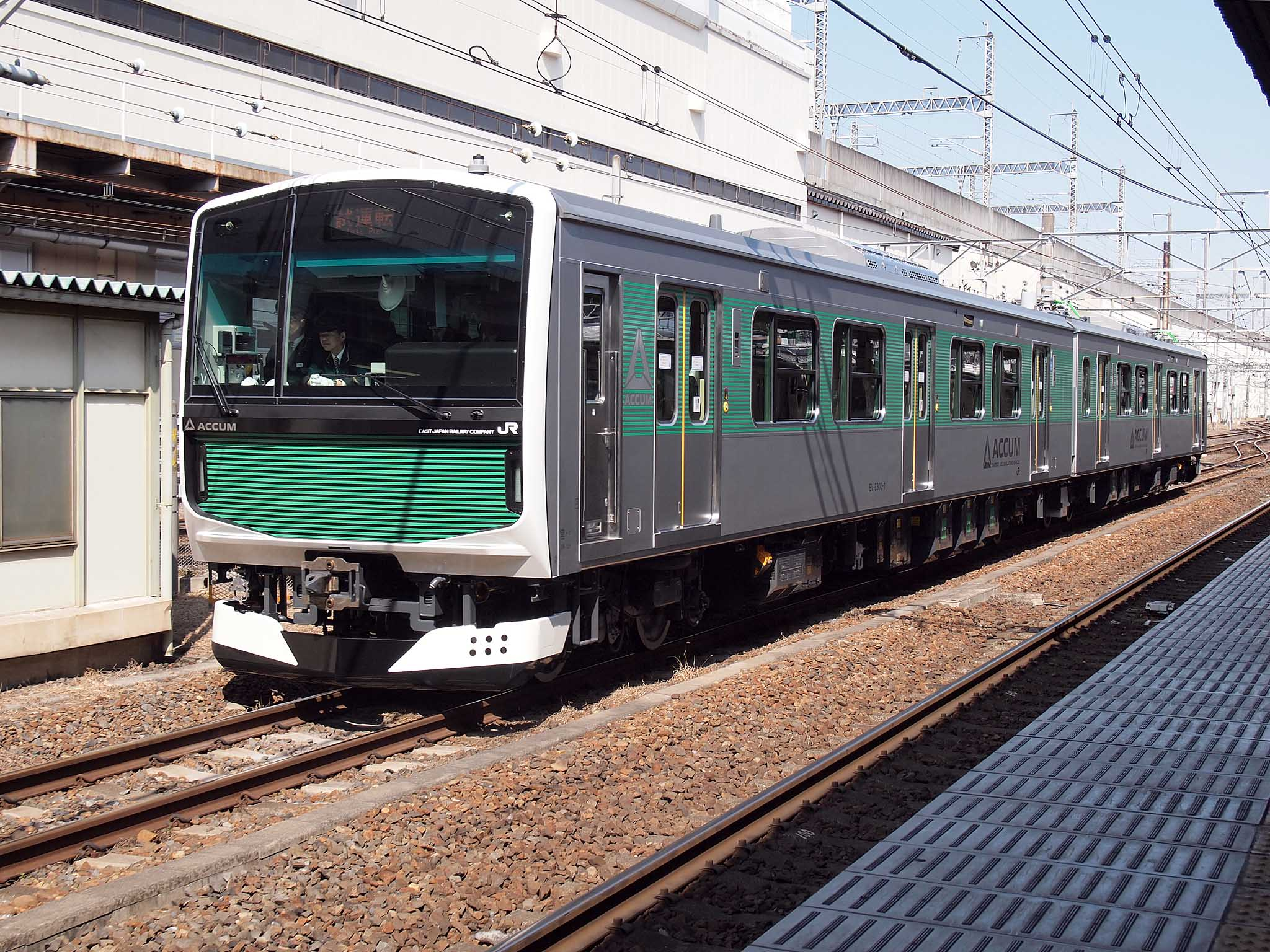
The first EV-E301 series two-car battery EMU in March 2014

The "NE Train" again underwent modifications at Tokyu Car Corporation's factory in Yokohama in 2009 to become a battery electric multiple unit with the addition of a pantograph and storage batteries replacing the earlier fuel cell, and rebranded "NE Train Smart Denchi-kun" (NE Train スマート電池くん). This railcar has a maximum service speed of 100 km/h (62 mph) and can operate on battery power alone a distance of up to 50 km (31 mi) away from an overhead power supply.

The railcar was test-run within Ōmiya Works from October 2009, with test running on the Utsunomiya Line under consideration from January 2010.

The unit was modified in August 2011, with one of the four lithium battery units relocated beneath the passenger seats, increasing available space.

In February and March 2012, the programme entered its final phase. Nighttime trial runs were conducted on the non-electrified Karasuyama Line outside operating hours. A recharging facility was built at the line terminus Karasuyama Station. It consists of a rigid overhead conductor bar which recharges the train via its pantograph. The overhead conductor bar is rated at 1,500 V DC, powered by local electricity grid at 6,600 V AC. A single charge of 10 minutes gives a range of approximately 20 km (12 mi).

The programme eventually developed into the EV-E301 series, a two-car battery electric multiple unit. The series entered passenger service on the Karasuyama Line and Tohoku Main Line in March 2014.

== See also ==
- Smart BEST, an experimental Japanese battery train built by Kinki Sharyo in 2012
