= Takanezawa =

Takanezawa 高根沢町
- Town
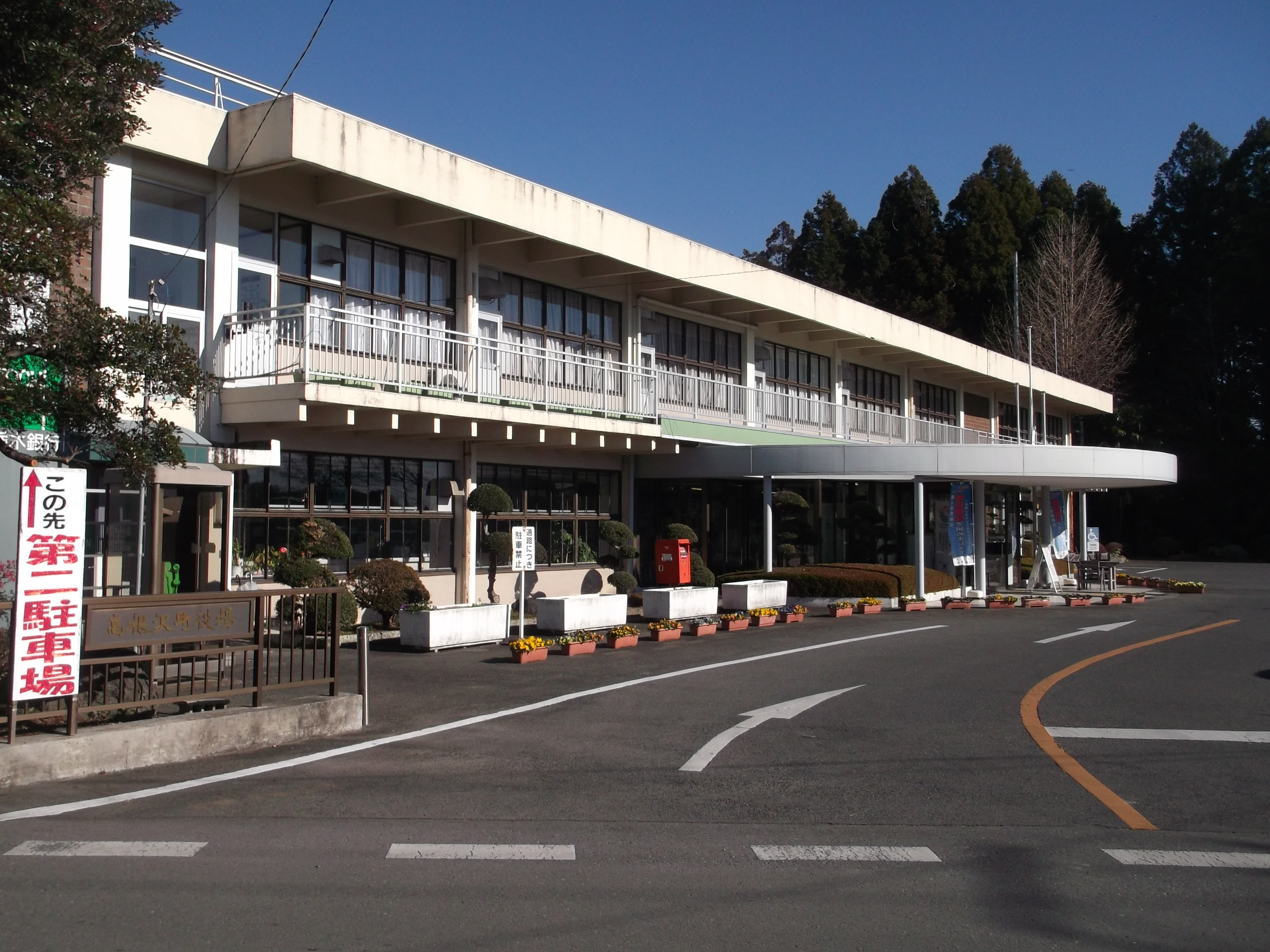
- Takanezawa town office

- Flag Seal

- Location of Takanezawa in Tochigi Prefecture

- Coordinates: 36°37′51.5″N 139°59′11.5″E
- Country: Japan
- Region: Kantō
- Prefecture: Tochigi Prefecture
- District: Shioya

Area
  - Total: 70.87 km^{2} (27.36 sq mi)

Population (July 2020)
  - Total: 29,528
  - Density: 416.7/km^{2} (1,079/sq mi)
- Time zone: UTC+9 (Japan Standard Time)
- Tree: Ginkgo biloba
- Flower: Siberian Iris
- Bird: Eurasian skylark
- Phone number: 028-675-8100
- Address: Ishizue 2053, Takanezawa-machi, Shioya-gun, Tochigi-ken 329-1292
- Website: Official website

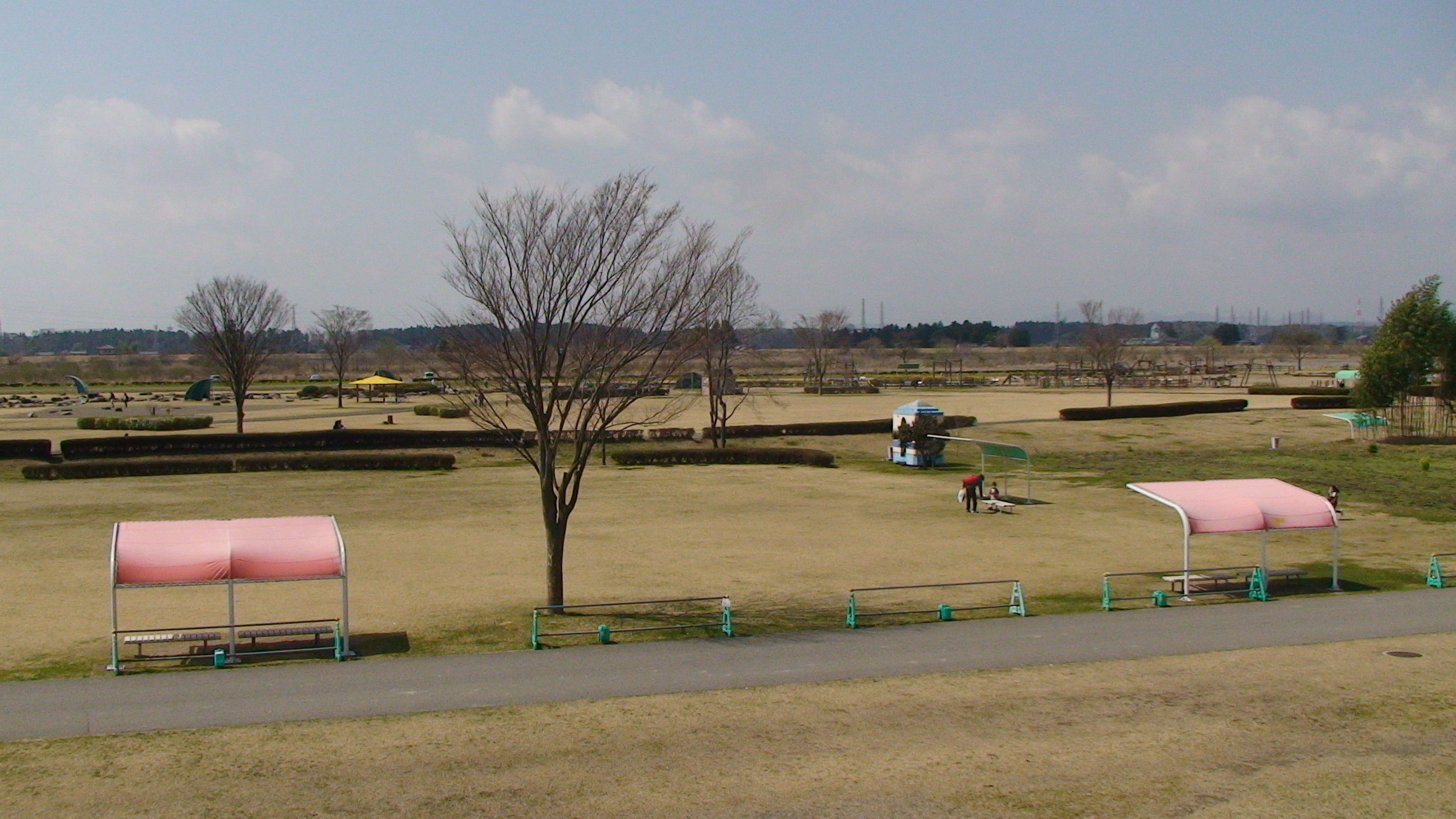
Park in Takanezawa

Takanezawa (高根沢町, Takanezawa-machi) is a town located in Tochigi Prefecture, Japan. As of 1 July 2020, the town had an estimated population of 29,528 in 12,618 households, and a population density of 420 persons per km^{2}. The total area of the town is 70.87 square kilometres (70,870,000 m^{2})

== Geography ==
Takanezawa is located in the flatlands of east-central Tochigi Prefecture with an average elevation of 109–195 meters. Over 65% of the town area is agricultural. The town is bordered by Utsunomiya to the west, across the Kinugawa River.

== Surrounding municipalities ==
Tochigi Prefecture

- Haga
- Ichikai
- Nasukarasuyama
- Sakura
- Utsunomiya

== Climate ==
Nasu has a humid continental climate (Köppen Cfa) characterized by warm summers and cold winters with heavy snowfall. The average annual temperature in Nasu is 13.2 °C. The average annual rainfall is 1424 mm with September as the wettest month. The temperatures are highest on average in August, at around 25.4 °C, and lowest in January, at around -1.8 °C.

== Demographics ==
Per Japanese census data, the population of Takanezawa has recently plateaued after a long period of growth.

Historical population
Year	Pop.	±%
1960	21,479	—
1970	20,662	−3.8%
1980	22,765	+10.2%
1990	26,328	+15.7%
2000	29,777	+13.1%
2010	30,534	+2.5%
2020	29,229	−4.3%

== History ==
Akutsu village, Kitatakanezawa village, and Niita village were created within Shioya District of Tochigi Prefecture on April 1, 1889, with the creation of the modern municipalities system after the Meiji Restoration. In April 1953 Akutsu village was elevated in status into Akutsu town. On March 31, 1954, Niita village was dissolved, with a portion merging with Kitatakanezawa village, and a portion going to Ujie Town (also in Shioya District). Akutsu and Kitatakanezawa merged on April 1, 1958, to create the town of Takanezawa.

== Government ==
Takanezawa has a mayor-council form of government with a directly elected mayor and a unicameral town council of 16 members. Takanezawa, together with the city of Sakura and town of Shioya collectively contributes two members to the Tochigi Prefectural Assembly. In terms of national politics, the town is part of Tochigi 2nd district of the lower house of the Diet of Japan.

== Economy ==
The economy of Takanezawa is heavily dependent on agriculture, with rice cultivation as the primary crop. Secondary crops include tobacco, wheat, strawberries and pears. The town is increasingly becoming a bedroom community for neighboring Utsunomiya.

== Education ==
Takanezawa has six public primary schools and two public middle schools operated by the town government. The town has one public high school operated by the Tochigi Prefectural Board of Education

== Transportation ==
=== Railway ===
JR East – Tōhoku Main Line (Utsunomiya Line)

- Hōshakuji

JR East – Karasuyama Line

- Hōshakuji - Shimotsuke-Hanaoka - Niita

=== Highway ===
- National Route 4
- National Route 408

== Local attractions ==
- Takanezawa Onsen
