= Karasuyama Line =

Railway line in Tochigi Prefecture, Japan

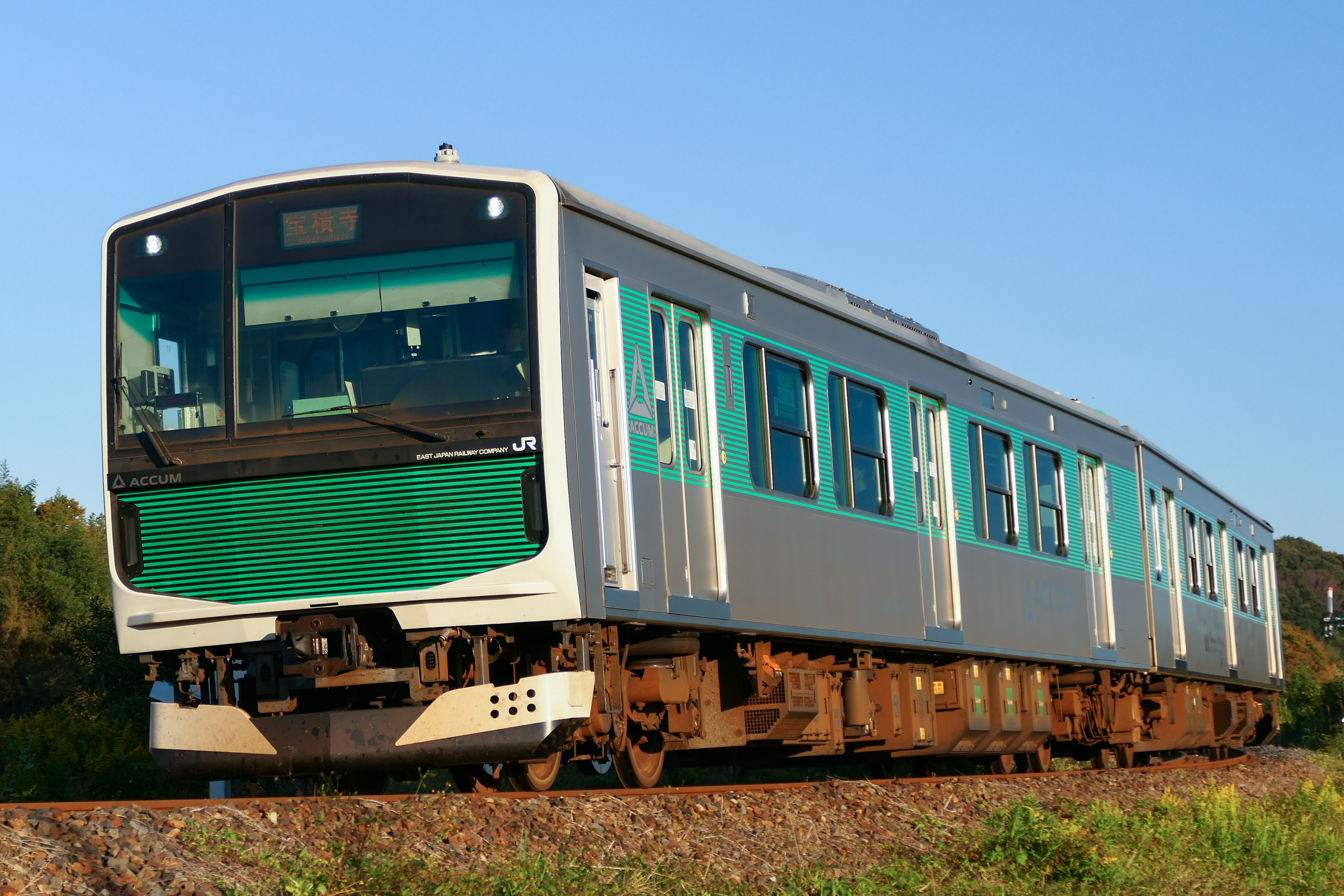
- An EV-E301 series BEMU on the Karasuyama Line in October 2023

Overview
- Native name: 烏山線
- Status: In operation
- Owner: JR East
- Locale: Tochigi Prefecture
- Termini: Hōshakuji; Karasuyama
- Stations: 8

Service
- Type: Regional rail
- Operator(s): JR East
- Rolling stock: EV-E301 series BEMU

History
- Opened: 15 April 1923; 103 years ago

Technical
- Line length: 20.4 km (12.7 mi)
- Number of tracks: Single tracked
- Character: Fairly rural
- Track gauge: 1,067 mm (3 ft 6 in)
- Electrification: None
- Operating speed: 65 km/h (40 mph)
Route map

The Karasuyama Line (烏山線, Karasuyama-sen) is a railway line in Tochigi Prefecture, Japan, owned and operated by East Japan Railway Company (JR East). It connects Hōshakuji in the town of Takanezawa with Karasuyama in Nasukarasuyama.

== Services ==
All services on the line are Local trains, stopping at every station.

Trains run approximately once every hour during morning & evening peak hours and every 2 hours during the interpeak. All trains operate a through service to/from Utsunomiya via the Utsunomiya Line (Tohoku Main Line) - except during evening peak hours when trains terminate/commence at Hōshakuji between 16:00 & 19:30.

== Stations ==
Station	Japanese	Distance (km)		Transfers	Location
Station	Japanese	Between stations	Total	Transfers	Location
↑ All trains (except during evening peak) operate a through service to/from Utsunomiya via the Utsunomiya Line ↑
Hōshakuji	宝積寺	-	0.0	Utsunomiya Line	Takanezawa, Shioya District
Shimotsuke-Hanaoka	下野花岡	3.9	3.9		Takanezawa, Shioya District
Niita	仁井田	2.0	5.9		Takanezawa, Shioya District
Kōnoyama	鴻野山	2.4	8.3		Nasukarasuyama
Ōgane	大金	4.4	12.7		Nasukarasuyama
Kobana	小塙	2.6	15.3		Nasukarasuyama
Taki	滝	2.2	17.5		Nasukarasuyama
Karasuyama	烏山	2.9	20.4		Nasukarasuyama

== Rolling stock ==
- EV-E301 series 2-car BEMU (since 15 March 2014)

From the start of the revised timetable on 15 March 2014, a new EV-E301 series two-car battery electric multiple unit (BEMU) was introduced on the Karasuyama Line and Tohoku Main Line between Utsunomiya and Karasuyama. Developed from the experimental "Smart Denchi-kun" battery electric railcar also tested on this line since 2012, the EV-E301 series train is recharged at a special recharging facility built at Karasuyama Station, and operates on battery power over the non-electrified Karasuyama Line tracks.

All of the remaining KiHa 40 series diesel trains used on the line were withdrawn on 3 March 2017, and replaced with EV-E301 series battery electric units from the start of the revised timetable on 4 March 2017.

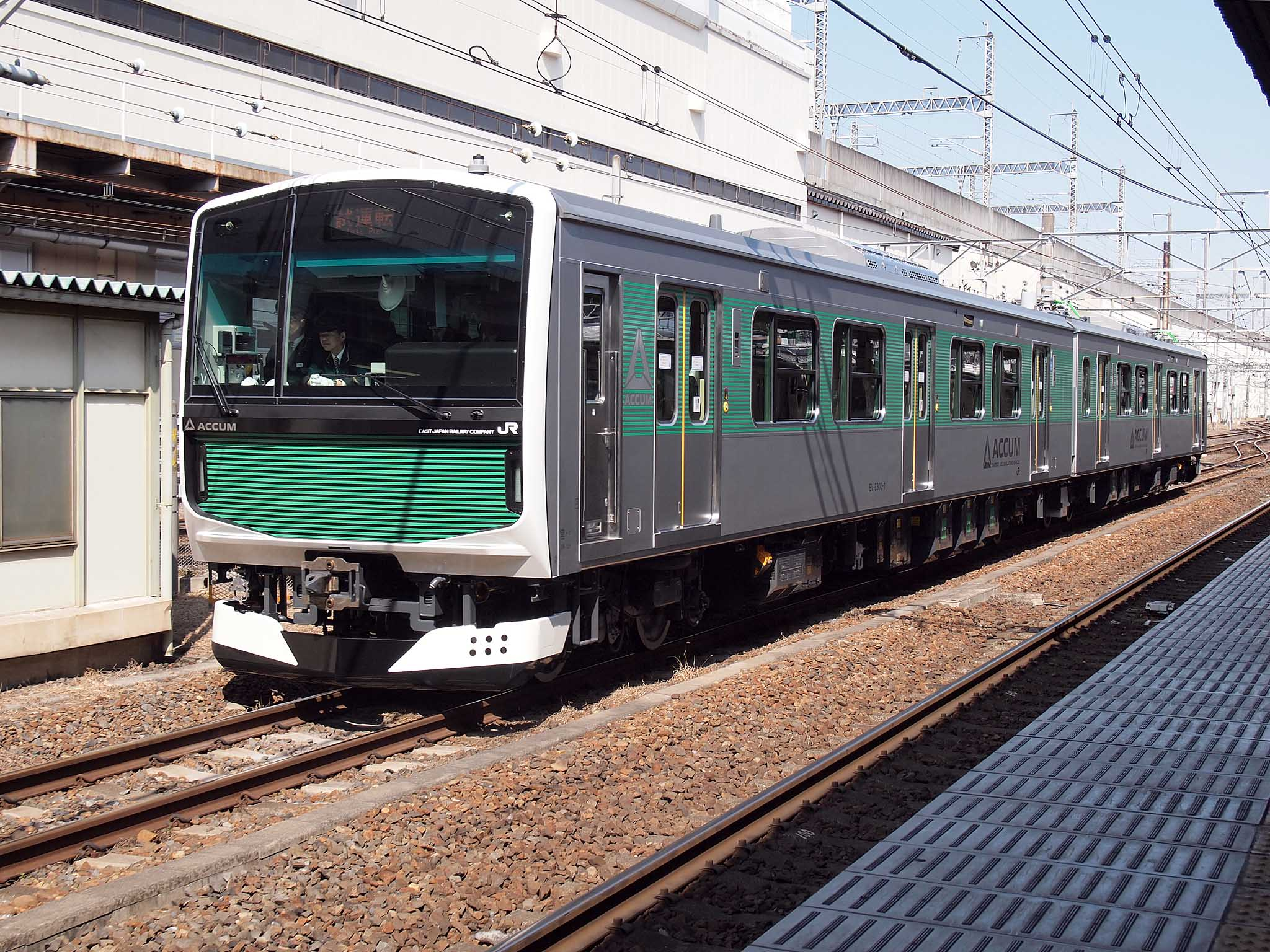
EV-E301 series BEMU set

=== Former rolling stock ===
- KiHa 40 series DMUs (until 3 March 2017)
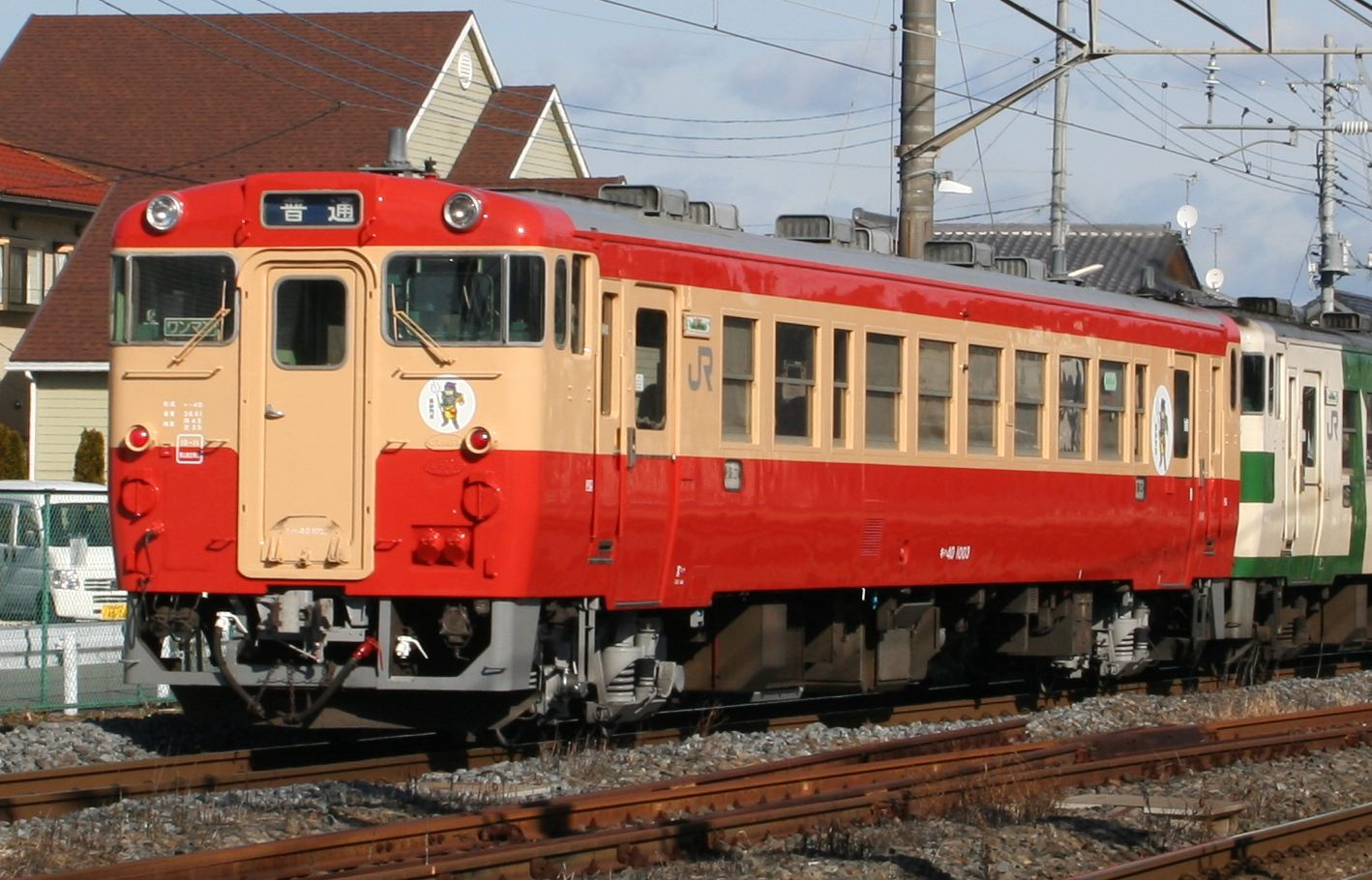
A KiHa 40-1000 series DMU in January 2011

== History ==
The line opened on 15 April 1923. With the privatization of Japanese National Railways (JNR) on 1 April 1987, the line came under the control of JR East.

Wanman driver only operation commenced on the line on 10 March 1990, using KiHa 40 series DMUs.
