= Hōshakuji Station =

Railway station in Takanezawa, Tochigi Prefecture, Japan

Hōshakuji Station 宝積寺駅
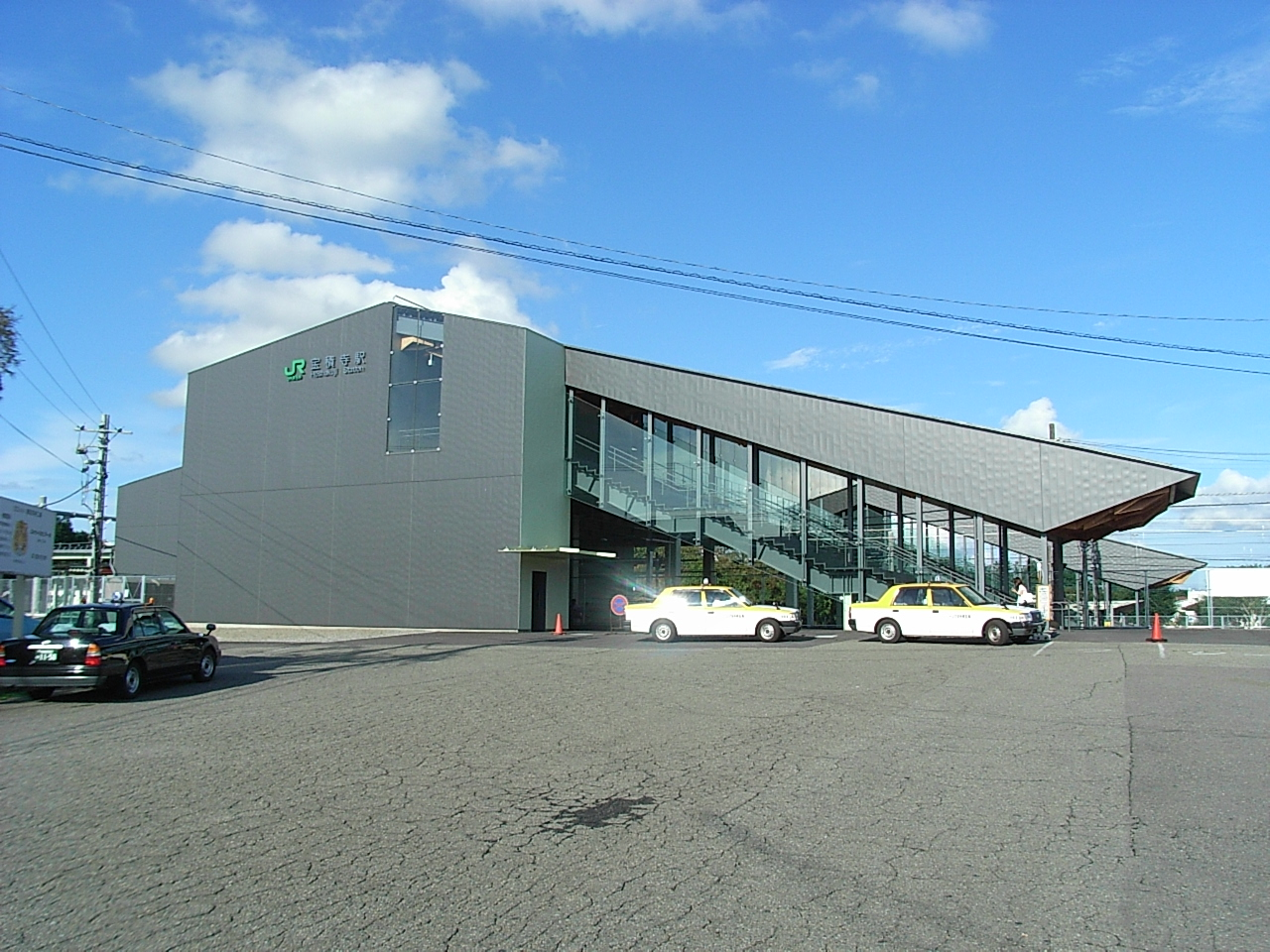
- Hōshakuji Station west entrance in 2008

General information
- Location: Hōshakuji, Takanezawa Town, Shioya District, Tochigi Prefecture 329-1233; Japan
- Coordinates: 36°37′53.36″N 139°58′46.27″E
- Operator: JR East; JR Freight
- Lines: Tōhoku Main Line; ( Utsunomiya Line); Karasuyama Line
- Distance: 121.2 km (75.3 mi) from Tokyo
- Platforms: 1 side platform + 1 island platform
- Tracks: 3

Construction
- Structure type: At grade

Other information
- Status: Staffed ( Midori no Madoguchi )
- Website: Official website

History
- Opened: 21 October 1899; 126 years ago

Passengers
- FY2019: 2,251

Services
| Preceding station | JR East | Following station |
|---|---|---|
| Okamoto towards Tokyo | Utsunomiya Line Local | Ujiie towards Kuroiso |
| Okamoto towards Utsunomiya | Karasuyama Line | Shimotsuke-Hanaoka towards Karasuyama |
Location
- Location within Tochigi Prefecture Location within Kanto Area Location within Japan

Hōshakuji Station (宝積寺駅, Hōshakuji-eki) is a junction railway station in the town of Takanezawa, Tochigi, Japan, operated by East Japan Railway Company (JR East). The station building was designed by Kengo Kuma and Associates. The station is also a freight terminal for the Japan Freight Railway Company (JR Freight).

== Lines ==
Hōshakuji Station is served by the Utsunomiya Line (Tohoku Main Line), and is 121.2 km from the starting point of the line at Tokyo. It is also a terminal station for the Karasuyama Line, a 20.4 km branch line to Karasuyama.

== Station layout ==
The station has an elevated station building, with one side platform and one island platform underneath. The station has a Midori no Madoguchi staffed ticket office.

=== Platforms ===
| 1 | ■ Utsunomiya Line | for Yaita, Nasushiobara, and Kuroiso |
| 2 | ■ Utsunomiya Line (Ueno-Tokyo Line) | for Utsunomiya, Ōmiya, Ueno, Tokyo, Yokohama, Atami (via Tokaido Line) |
| 3 | ■ Karasuyama Line | for Niita and Karasuyama for Utsunomiya |

== History ==
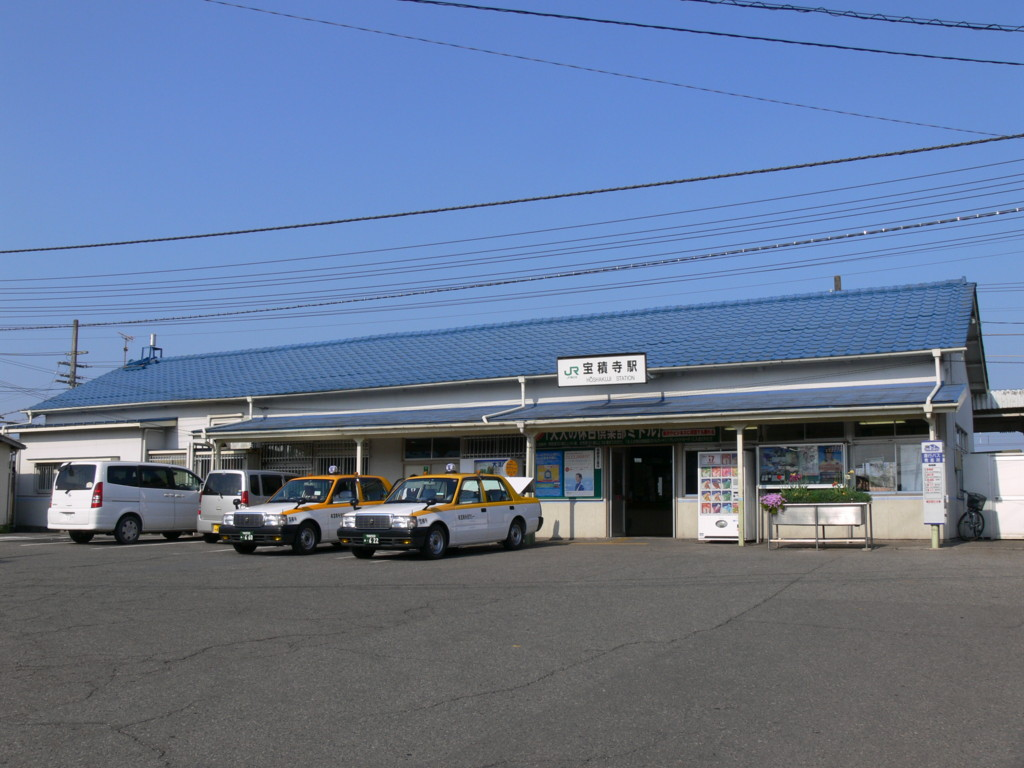
The station in May 2007, before rebuilding

Hōshakuji Station opened on 21 October 1899. With the privatization of Japanese National Railways (JNR) on 1 April 1987, the station came under the control of JR East.

== Passenger statistics ==
In fiscal 2019, the station was used by an average of 2251 passengers daily (boarding passengers only). The passenger figures for previous years are as shown below.

| Fiscal year | Daily average |
|---|---|
| 2000 | 2,046 |
| 2005 | 2,036 |
| 2010 | 2,213 |
| 2015 | 2,203 |

== Surrounding area ==
- Takanezawa Town Hall
- Takanezawa Post Office
- National Route 4
- Kinugawa River

== Gallery ==
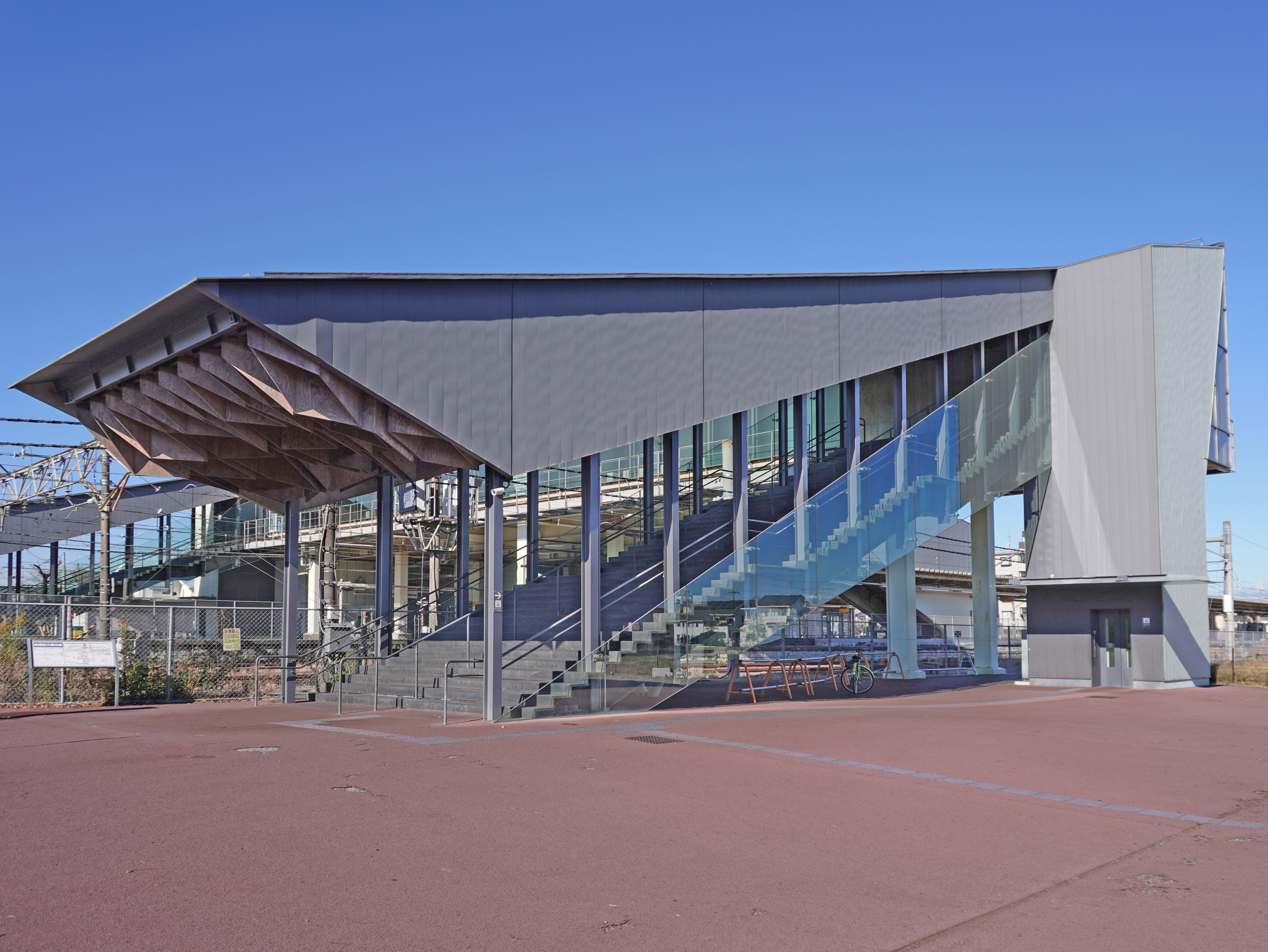
Eastern Exit, November 2022

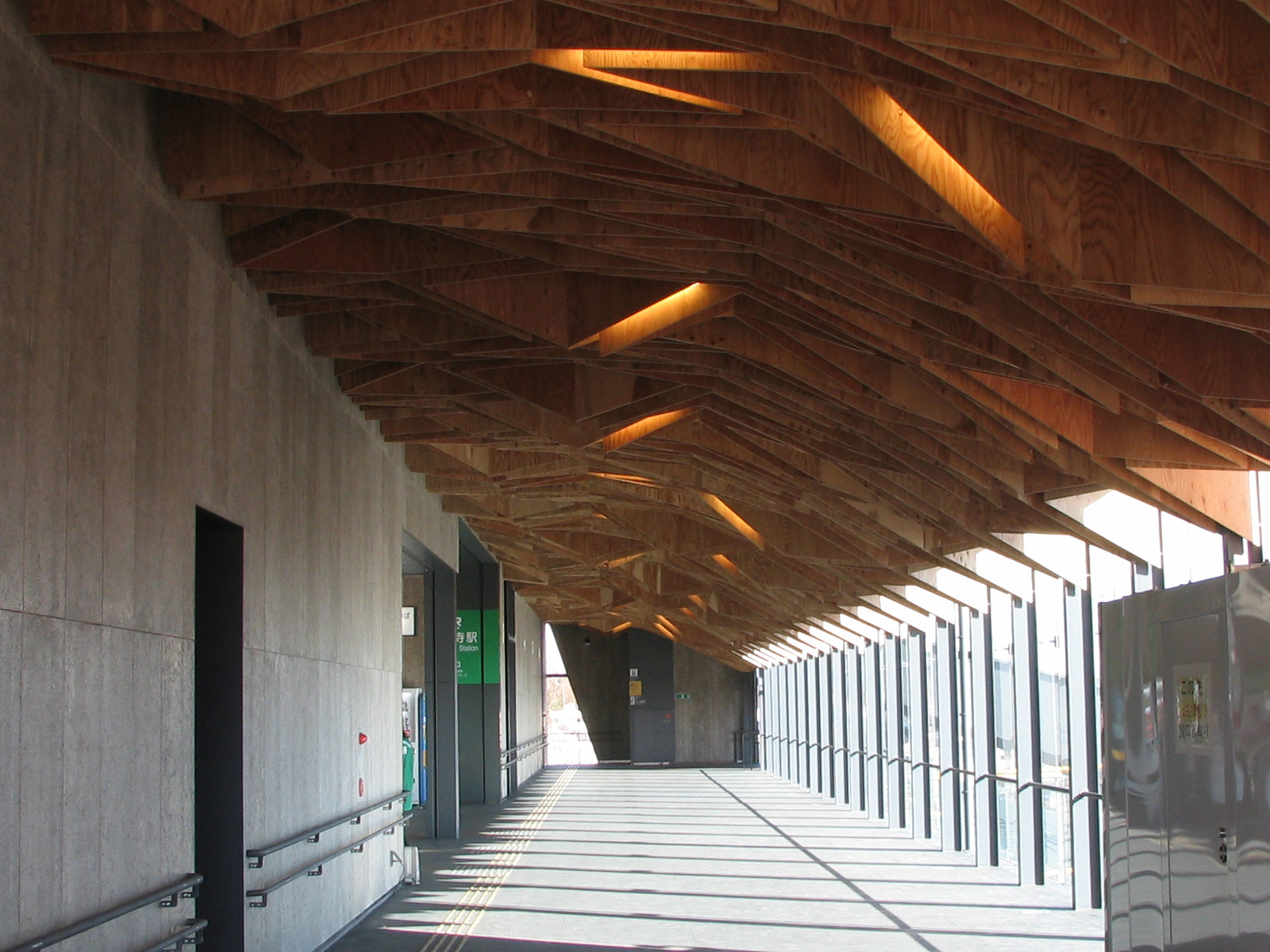
Aisle, December 2016

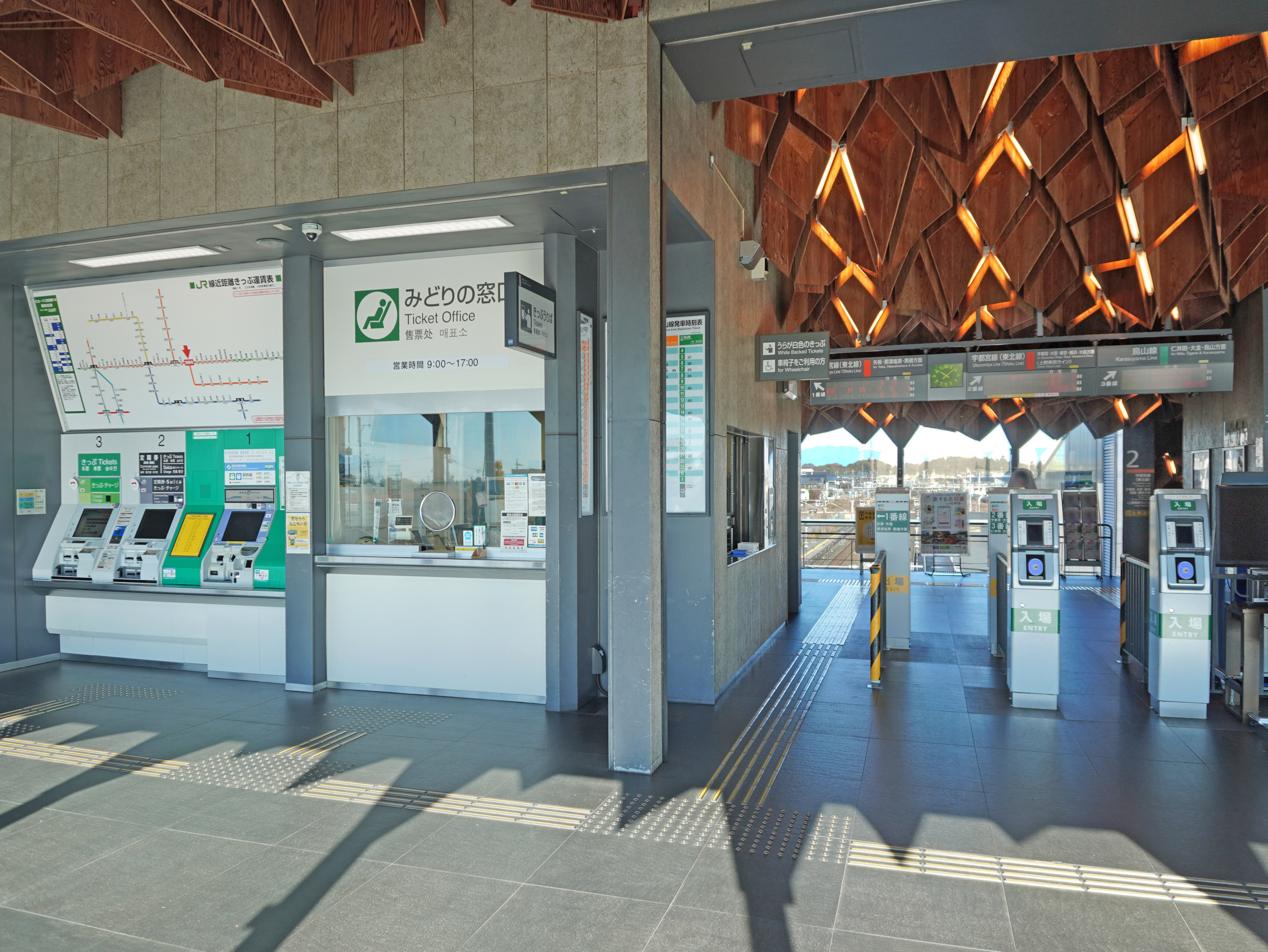
Fare gates, ticket office and machines, November 2022

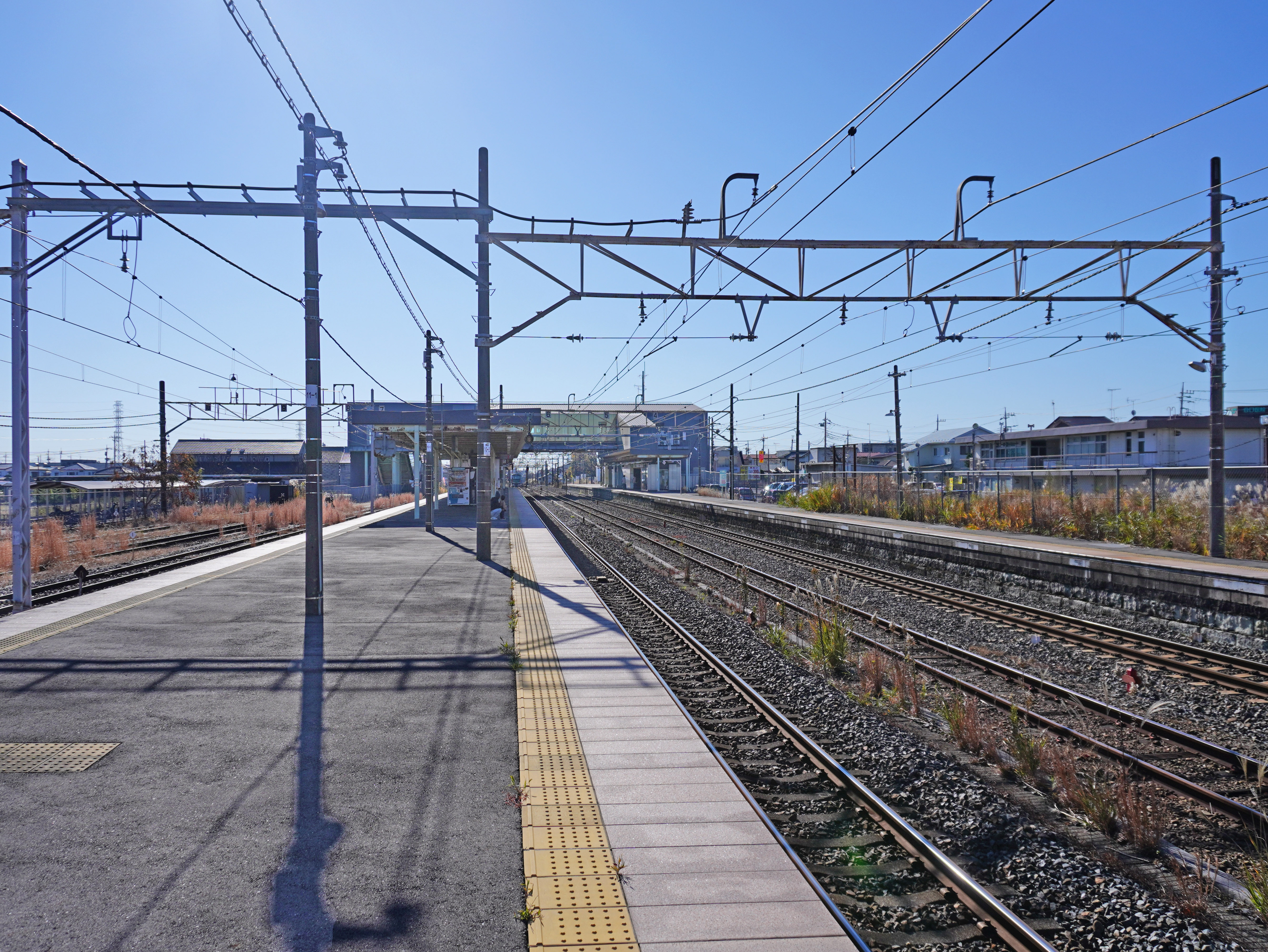
Platforms, 2022

== See also ==
- List of railway stations in Japan
