= Karasuyama Station =

Railway station in Nasukarasuyama, Tochigi Prefecture, Japan

Karasuyama Station 烏山駅
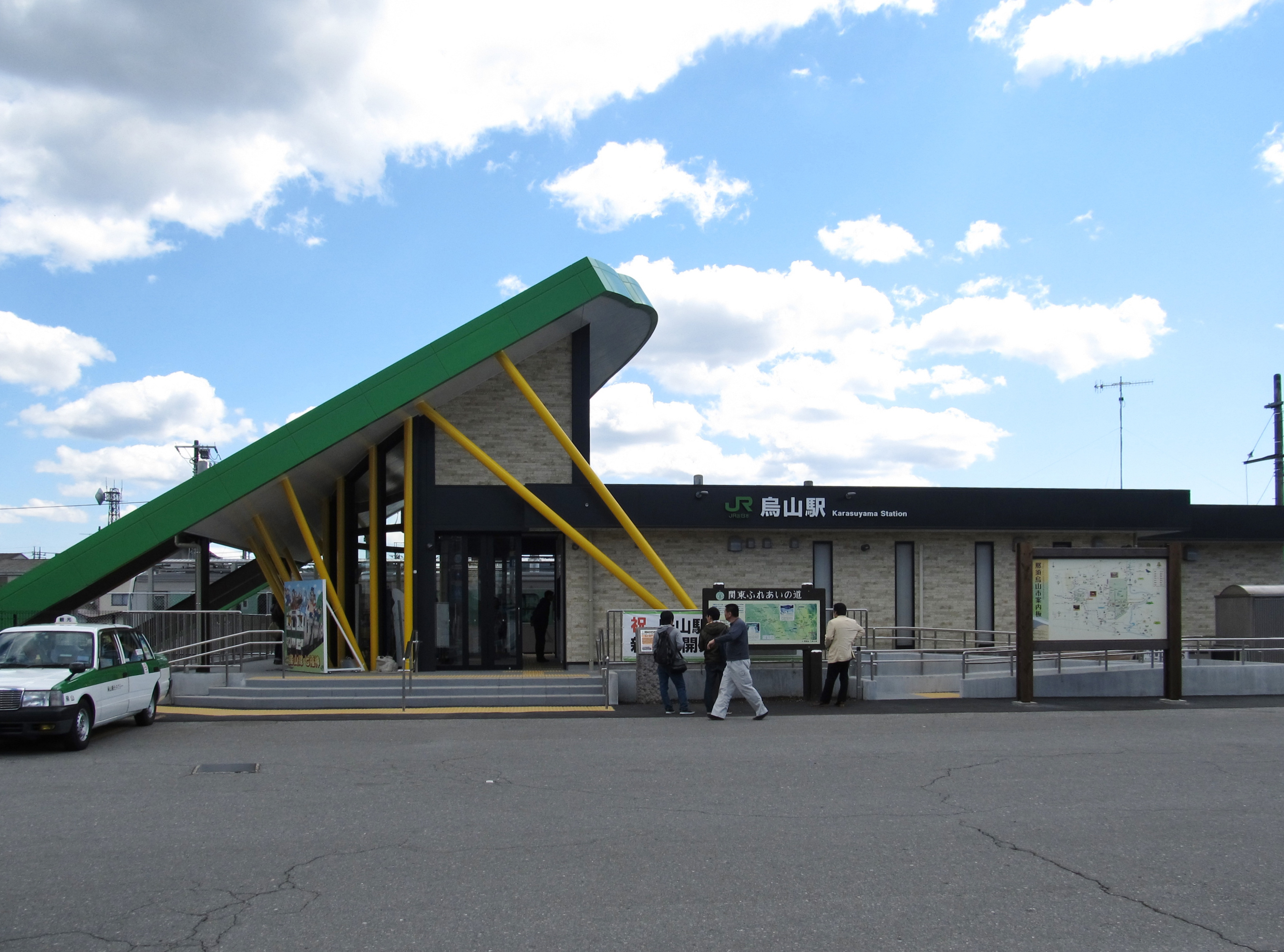
- The station building and forecourt in April 2014 after rebuilding

General information
- Location: 2-chōme-5 Minami, Nasukarasuyama-shi, Tochigi-ken 321-0627; Japan
- Coordinates: 36°39′1.56″N 140°9′17.89″E
- Operator: JR East
- Line: ■ Karasuyama Line
- Distance: 20.4 km from Hōshakuji
- Platforms: 1 side platform
- Connections: Bus stop

Other information
- Status: Staffed
- Website: Official website

History
- Opened: 15 April 1923

Passengers
- FY2019: 537 daily

Services
Preceding station	JR East	Following station
Taki towards Utsunomiya	Karasuyama Line	Terminus
Location
- Location within Tochigi Prefecture Location within Japan

Karasuyama Station (烏山駅, Karasuyama-eki) is a railway station in the city of Nasukarasuyama, Tochigi, Japan, operated by the East Japan Railway Company (JR East).

== Lines ==
Karasuyama Station forms the terminus of the Karasuyama Line, a 20.4 km branch line from Hōshakuji.

== Station layout ==
The station consists of one side platform serving a single track. The station formerly had a "Midori no Madoguchi" staffed ticket office, but this closed from August 2013, and tickets are available only from ticket vending machines.

In February 2012, a recharging facility was built at the station for use by the experimental NE Train battery railcar, which is undergoing testing on the line. The recharging facility consists of a rigid overhead conductor enabling the train to be recharged via its pantograph. The overhead conductor bar is electrified at 1,500 V DC, powered from the local electricity grid 6.6 kV AC supply.

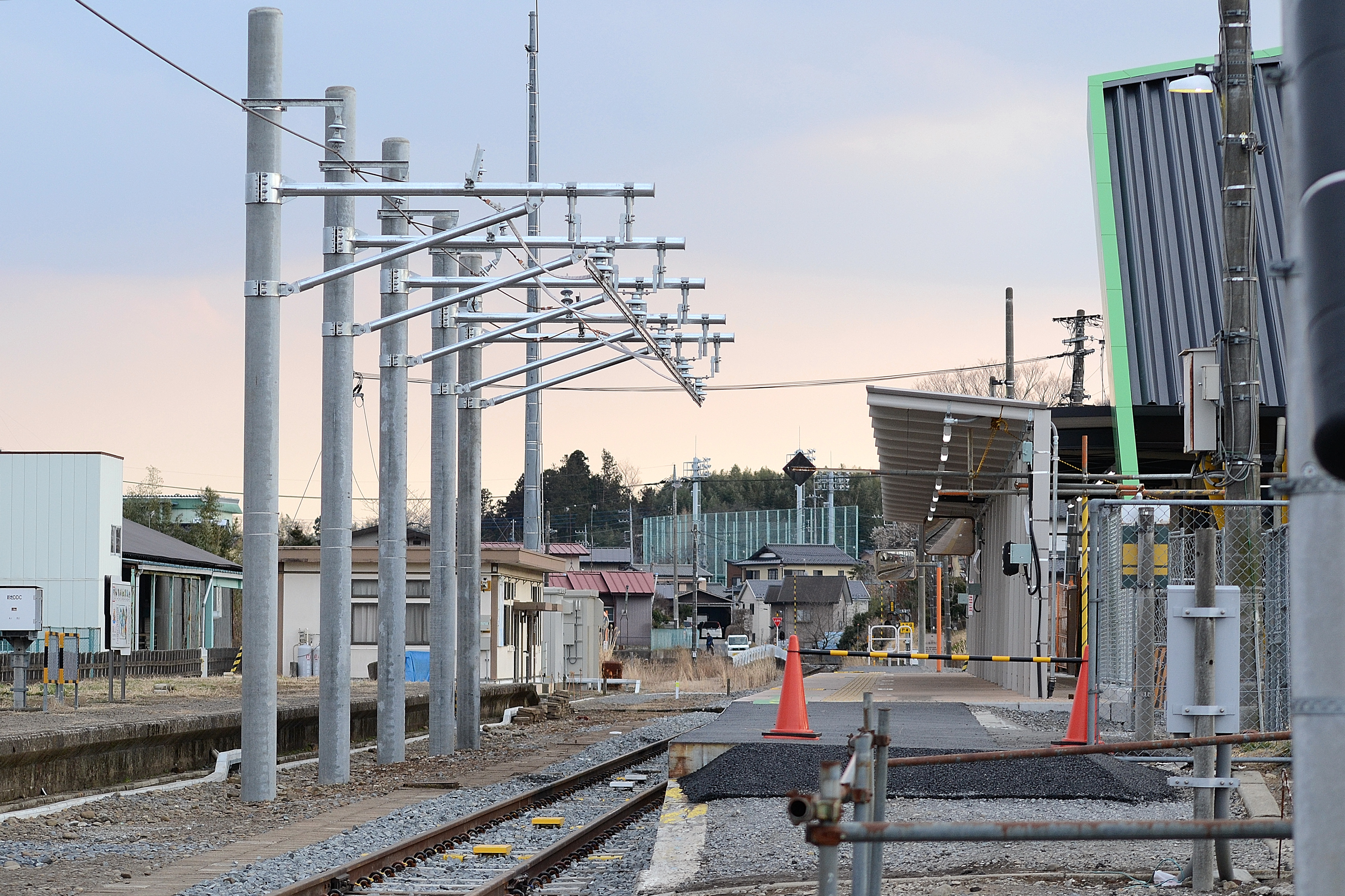
The overhead recharging facility, March 2014

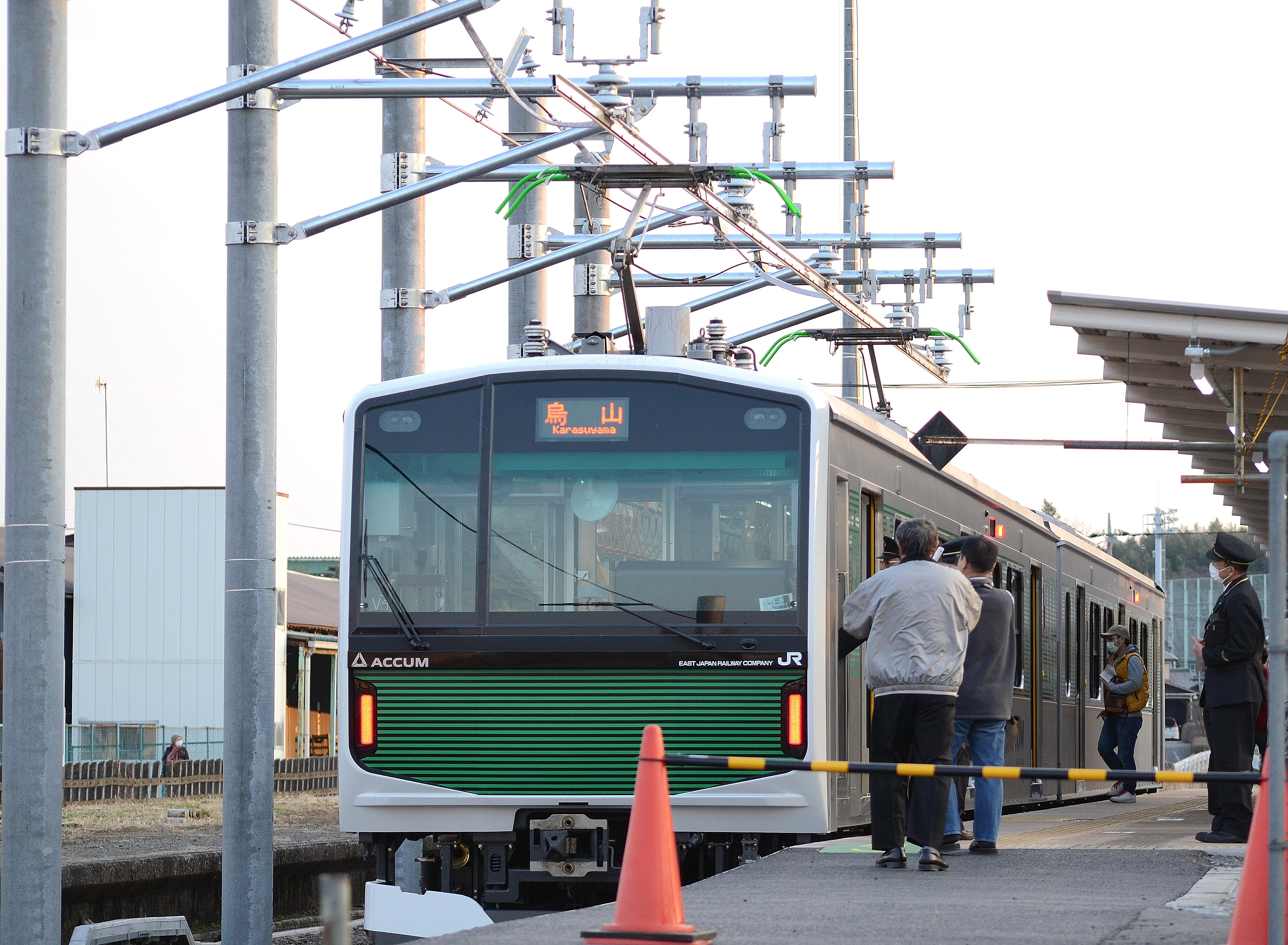
EV-E301 series battery EMU set V1 being recharged at Karasuyama Station, March 2014

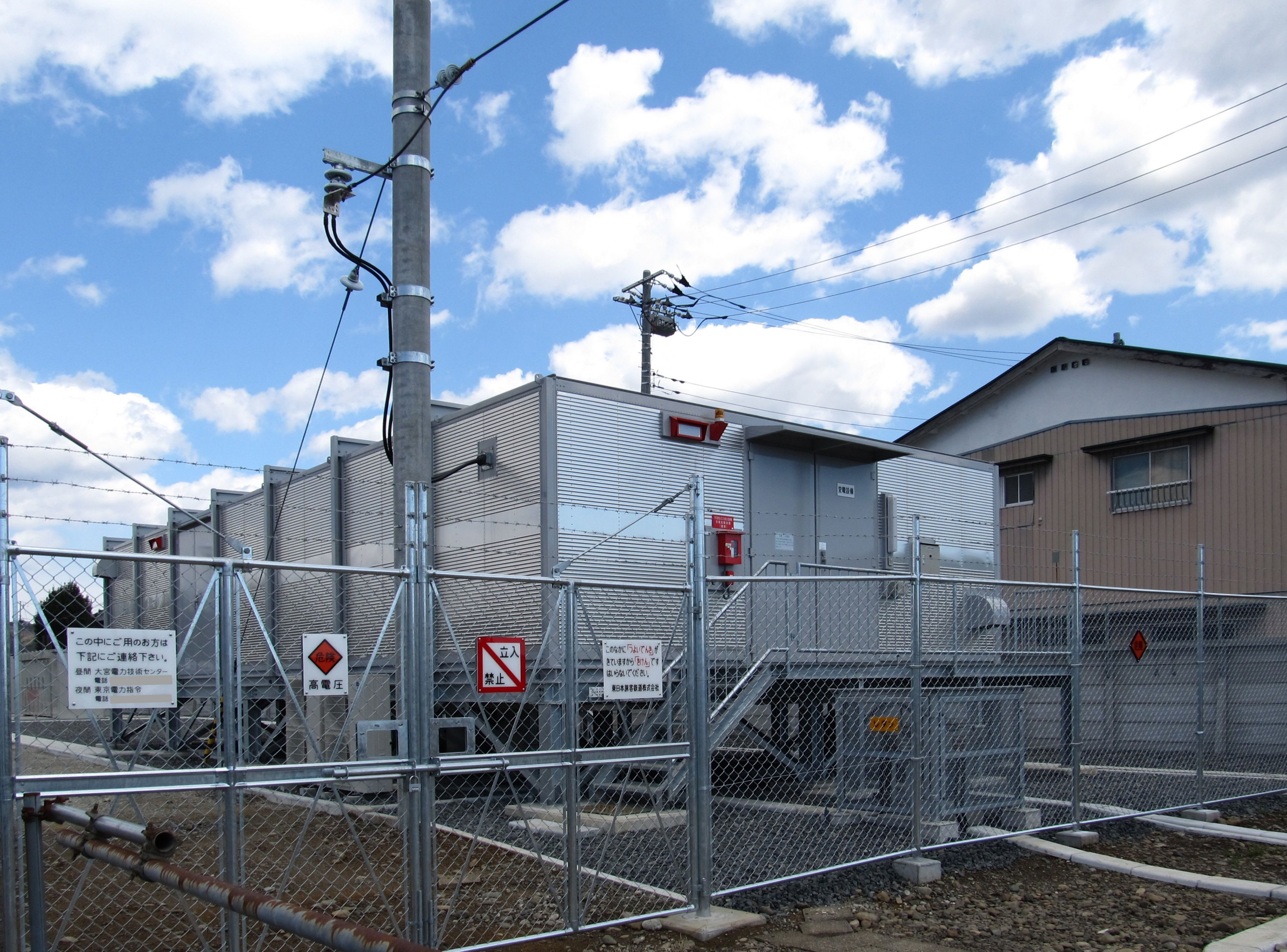
The substation feeding the recharging facility, April 2014

=== Platforms ===
1	■ Karasuyama Line	for Hōshakuji and Utsunomiya

== History ==
The station opened on 15 April 1923.

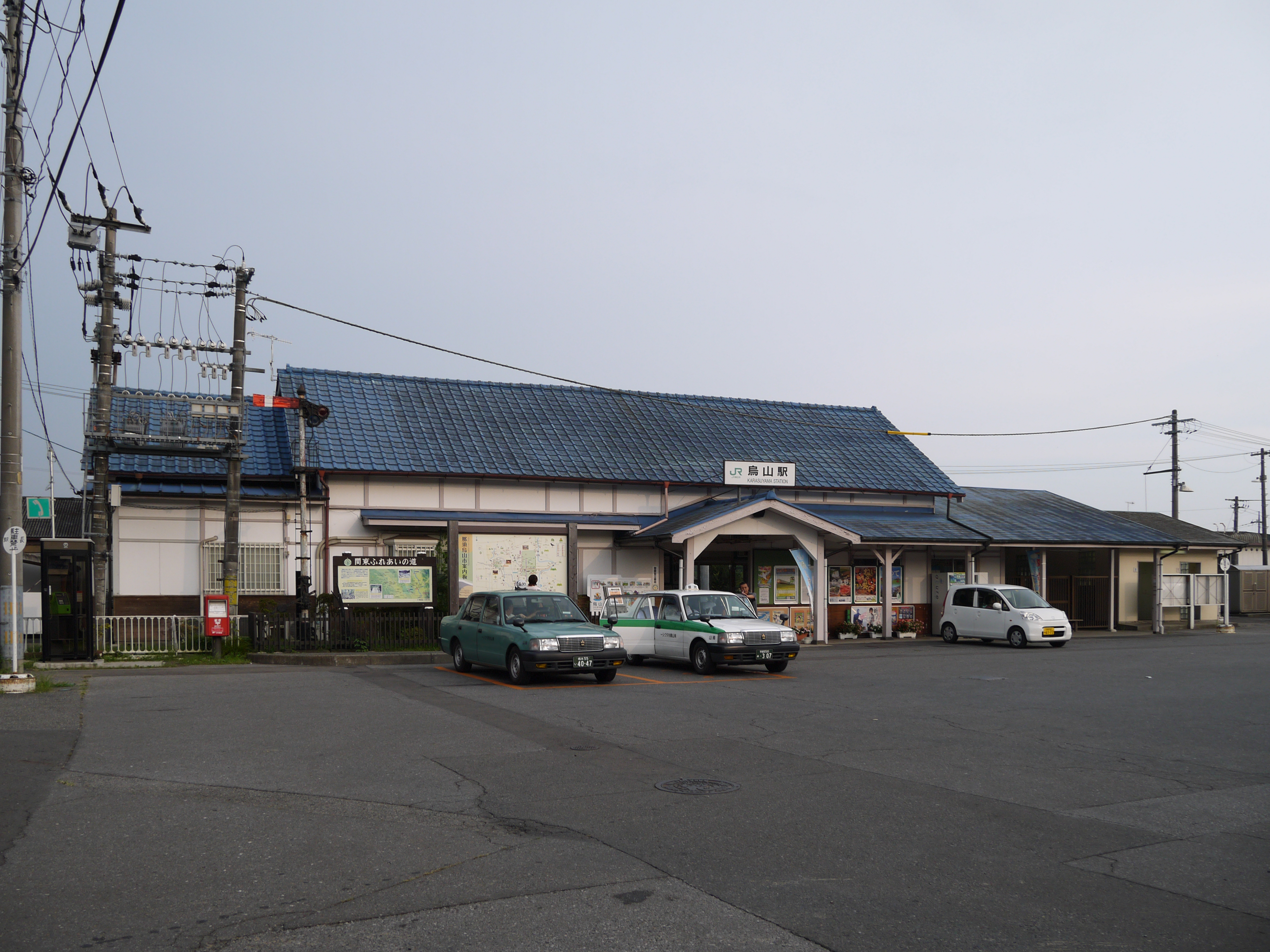
The station building and forecourt in August 2013, before rebuilding

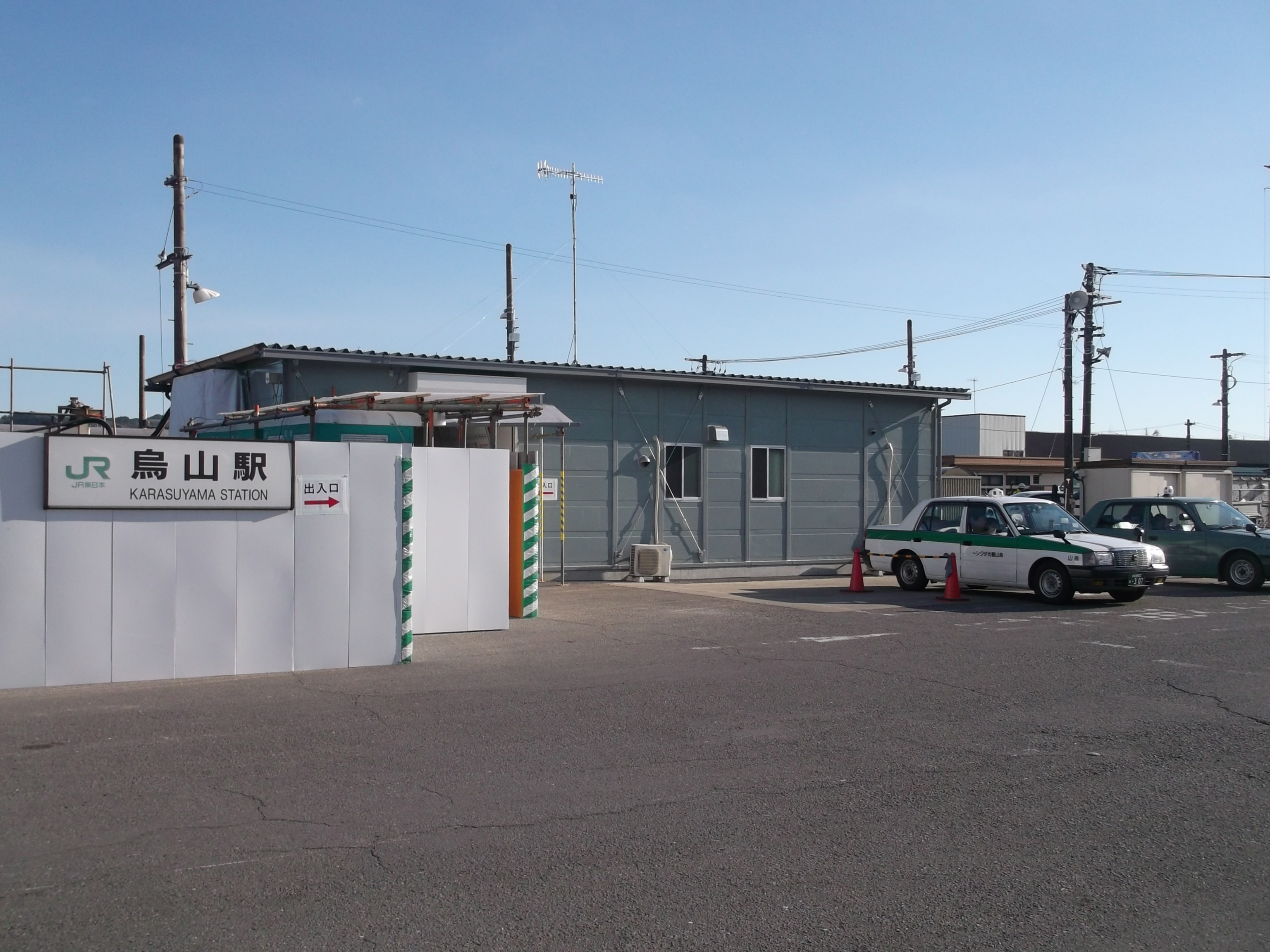
The temporary station structure in December 2013, during rebuilding work

== Surrounding area ==
- Nasukarasuyama City Office
- Karasuyama High School
- Naka River
- National Route 294
- Karasuyama Post Office

== Bus routes ==
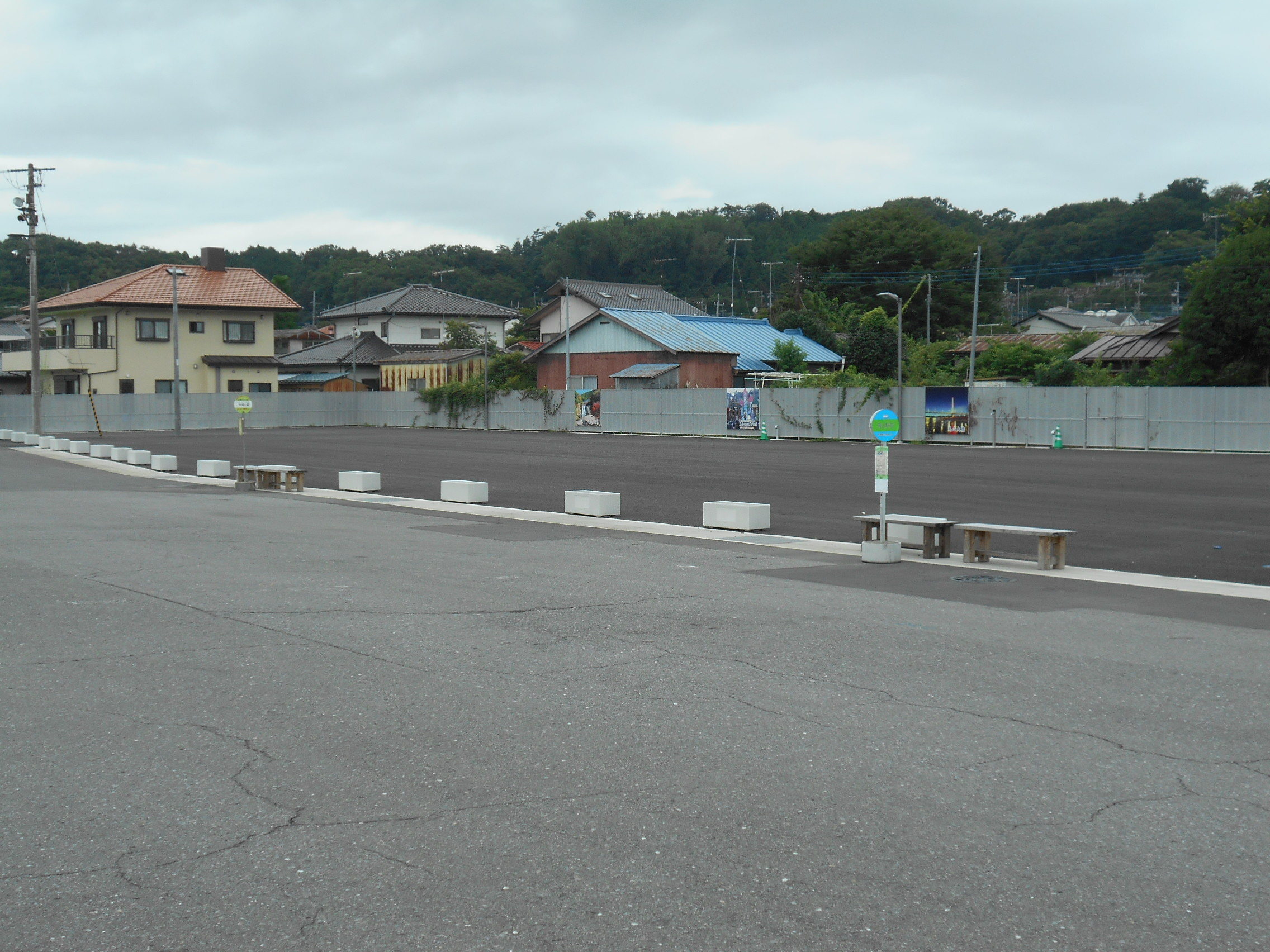
Rotary

- Karasuyama Municipal Bus - For Takabe Shako and Ichihana Station via Motegi Station
- Nakagawa Community Bus - For Nakagawa Village Hall

== Passenger statistics ==
In fiscal 2019, the station was used by an average of 537 passengers daily (boarding passengers only).

Fiscal year	Daily average
2000	-
2005	663
2010	555
2015	532

== See also ==
- List of railway stations in Japan
