= Dundrum, County Down =

Village in County Down, Northern Ireland

Coordinates: 54.25°N 5.85°W

Dundrum: Irish: Dún Droma
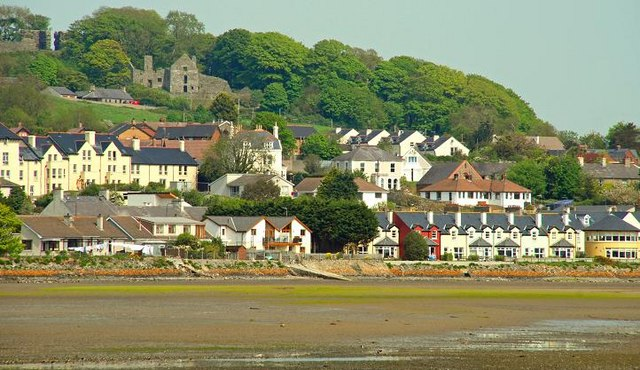

- Location within County Down
- Population: 1,538 (2021 census)
- District: Newry, Mourne and Down
- County: County Down
- Country: Northern Ireland
- Sovereign state: United Kingdom
- Post town: NEWCASTLE
- Postcode district: BT33
- Dialling code: 028
- UK Parliament: South Down
- NI Assembly: South Down

Dundrum (from Irish Dún Droma, meaning 'fort of the ridge') is a village and townland in County Down, Northern Ireland. It is beside Dundrum Bay, about four miles (six kilometres) outside Newcastle on the A2 road. The village is best known for its ruined Norman castle. The village had a population of 1,538 people at the 2021 census.

== History ==
=== Norman times ===
In 1177, the Normans, who had conquered great swathes of Ireland, invaded eastern Ulster and captured territories along its coast. John de Courcy, who had led the invasion, began building Dundrum Castle in the early 13th century on top of an earlier fort, "Dun Rury" (Rudraige), which was a seat for the remaining Ulaid septs east of the River Bann, after the collapse of the kingdom in the 4th century. The castle was to guard the land routes from Drogheda to Downpatrick. In 1203, de Courcy was expelled from Ulster by fellow Norman Hugh de Lacy, 1st Earl of Ulster. Two years later, de Courcy tried to re-take the castle but failed. It was visited by King John in 1210, who spent money for minor works to the castle and paid for a garrison there.

=== 15th century ===
Dundrum castle was held by the Earls of Ulster until the 15th century, it was captured by the Magennises of Mourne, a Gaelic clan. In 1517, the Earl of Kildare briefly captured the castle, as did the Lord Deputy Leonard Grey, 1st Viscount Grane in 1538. The castle was surrendered to the English Crown in 1601 by Phelim Magennis, granted to Edward Lord Cromwell and sold to the Blundell family. The Magennises re-took the castle during the Irish Confederate Wars/Eleven Years' War (1641–1653) but lost it to the Parliamentarians ("Roundheads") of the contenders versus the Cavaliers of King Charles I in the simultaneous English Civil War. The Blundells returned after the civil war during the Restoration of the Monarchy and built the house on the south edge of the castle.

=== 19th century ===
In 1806, Arthur Hill, 3rd Marquess of Downshire engaged engineers to develop the area. They recommended deepening the harbour to allow larger vessels to trade. By 1825 they had completed a new pier over 300 feet (90 metres) long.

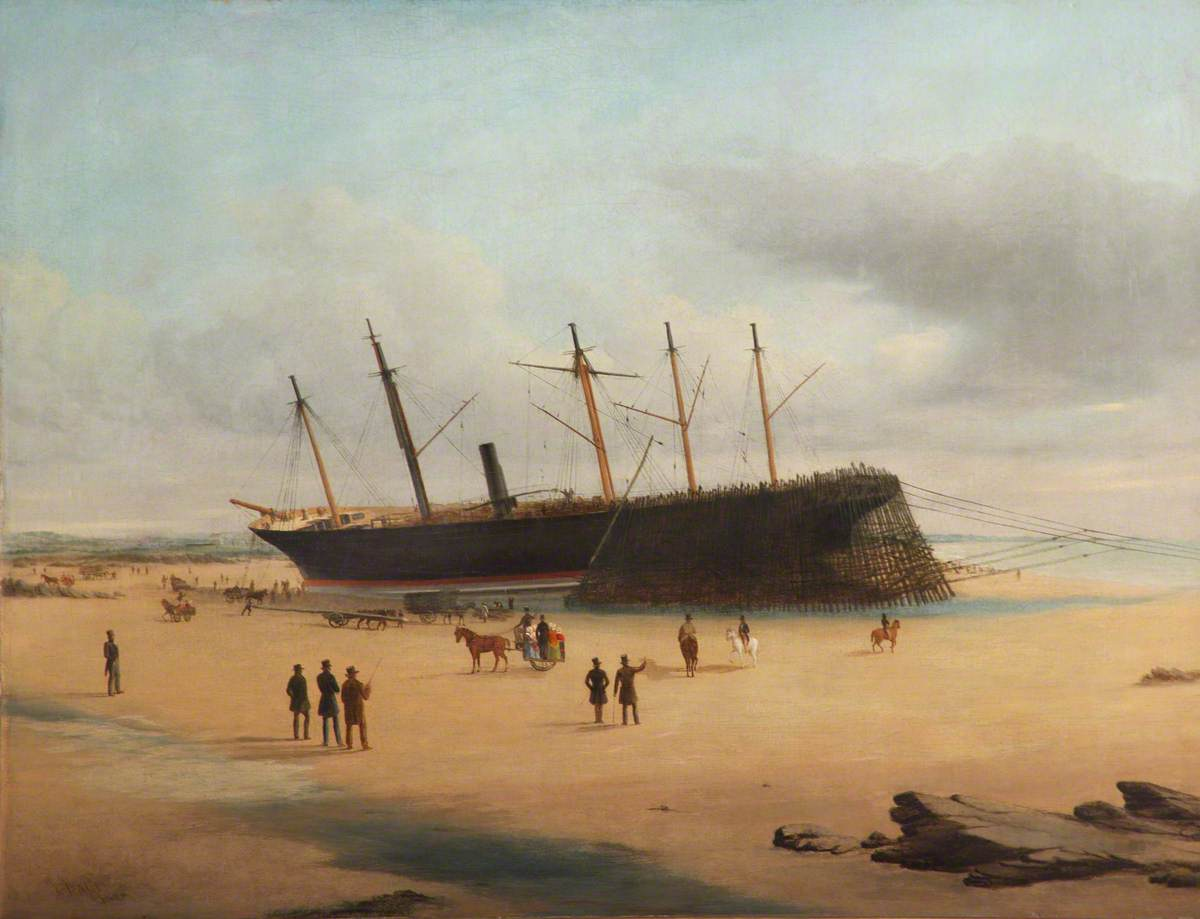
SS Great Britain stranded ashore in Dundrum Bay, 1846

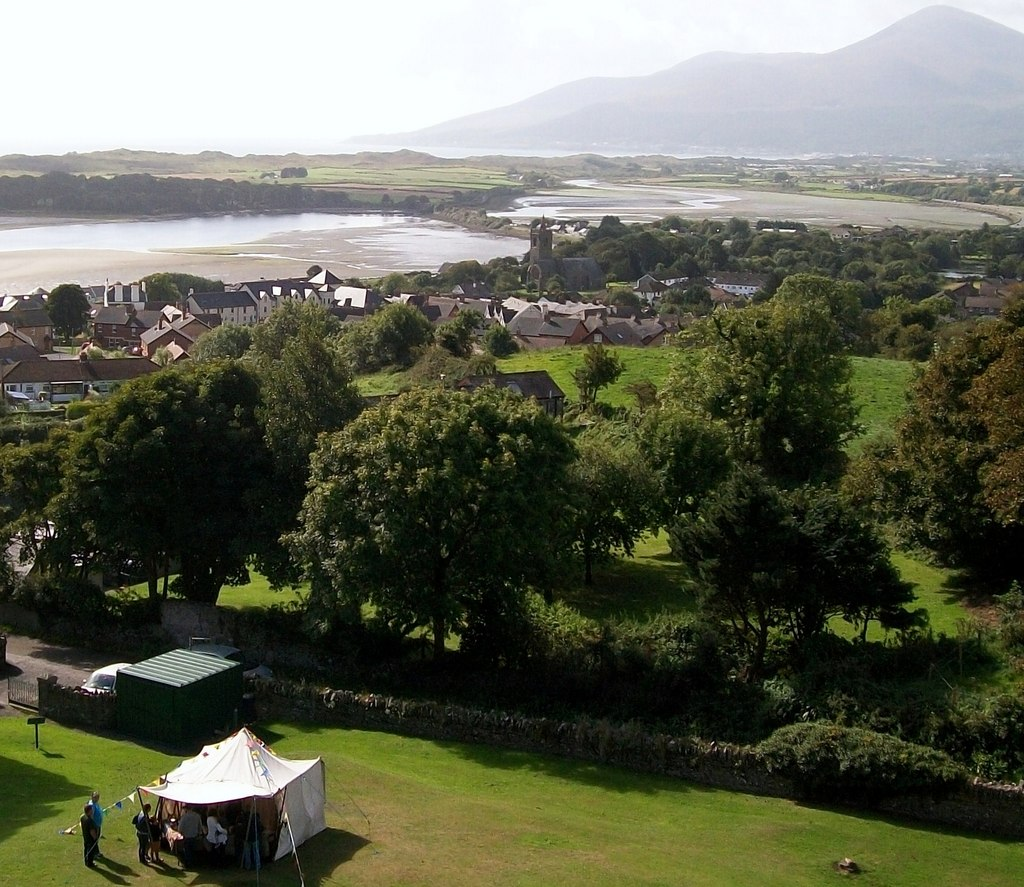
A view of Dundrum from the castle

The SS Great Britain ran aground in Dundrum Bay in 1846. There was no loss of life but it took nearly a year to refloat.

From 1866 a new iron screw steamer provided a service to Whitehaven, Cumbria and Dundrum became commercially important for both goods and passengers. It later lost trade to the deeper harbours of Warrenpoint and Belfast but Dundrum remained a commercial port until 1984.

=== 20th century ===
In 1967, nearby Murlough became Ireland's first nature reserve.

== Transport ==
Dundrum railway station was opened by the Belfast & County Down Railway on 25 March 1869 and operated until 16 January 1950.

== Sport ==
Dundrum Cricket Club plays in the NCU Senior League. Dundrum also has a Gaelic football club whose senior men play in Down's division 4 league and junior championship. Dundrum also have a senior men's football club Dundrum United FC who play in the 1st division of the Newcastle league.

== Climate ==
Climate data for Murlough (12 m elevation) 1981–2010
Month	Jan	Feb	Mar	Apr	May	Jun	Jul	Aug	Sep	Oct	Nov	Dec	Year
Mean daily maximum °C (°F)	8.2 (46.8)	8.5 (47.3)	10.2 (50.4)	12.1 (53.8)	14.9 (58.8)	17.2 (63.0)	19.1 (66.4)	18.9 (66.0)	17.0 (62.6)	13.8 (56.8)	10.6 (51.1)	8.5 (47.3)	13.3 (55.9)
Mean daily minimum °C (°F)	2.5 (36.5)	2.3 (36.1)	3.3 (37.9)	4.2 (39.6)	6.5 (43.7)	9.2 (48.6)	11.1 (52.0)	11.0 (51.8)	9.4 (48.9)	7.1 (44.8)	4.5 (40.1)	2.9 (37.2)	6.2 (43.2)
Average rainfall mm (inches)	106.6 (4.20)	74.8 (2.94)	80.4 (3.17)	63.2 (2.49)	66.8 (2.63)	68.3 (2.69)	60.5 (2.38)	81.8 (3.22)	73.6 (2.90)	100.0 (3.94)	105.3 (4.15)	101.9 (4.01)	983.1 (38.70)
Average rainy days (≥ 1.0 mm)	14.2	10.6	12.7	10.4	11.2	10.1	10.0	11.3	10.0	13.0	13.4	13.2	140.1
Mean monthly sunshine hours	46.3	76.2	108.5	147.7	180.6	140.1	146.5	148.9	121.1	99.5	61.3	31.1	1,307.8
Source: metoffice.gov.uk

== People ==
- Dr. James J. Drumm (1897–1974), inventor of the Drumm battery used in the Drumm Battery Train, was born in Dundrum.
- Leontia Flynn (born 1974), poet
- Gabrielle Glaister (born 1960), television actress, has a house in Dundrum and is a frequent resident.
- Patrick Kielty (born 1971), comedian and television presenter, was born and grew up in Dundrum

== Demography ==
At the 2011 census, the usually resident population of Dundrum was 1,555, accounting for 0.09% of the NI total. Of these:

- 22.77% were under 16 years old and 13.50% were aged 65 and above;
- 48.04% of the population were male and 51.96% were female; and
- 60.51% were from a Catholic community background and 32.54% were from a 'Protestant and Other Christian (including Christian related)' community background.
- 41.03% indicated that they had a British national identity, 32.15% had an Irish national identity, and 33.12% had a Northern Irish national identity.
