= Quebrada de Humahuaca tourist train =

Tourist train service in Argentina

Quebrada de Humahuaca Solar Train
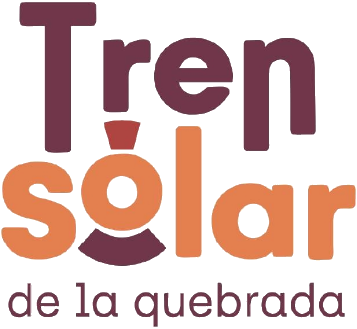

- Tren Solar running in Maimará

Overview
- Service type: Regional
- Status: Active
- Locale: Jujuy Province
- First service: June 2024; 2 years ago
- Current operator: Government of Jujuy
- Former operator: Ferrocarriles Argentinos
- Website: trensolar.com.ar

Route
- Termini: Volcán; Tilcara
- Stops: 6
- Distance travelled: 42 kilometres (26.1 mi)
- Service frequency: 30'

Technical
- Track gauge: 1,000 mm (3 ft 3 3/8 in) metre gauge
- Operating speed: 60 kilometres per hour (37 mph)
- Track owner: Government of Argentina

The Quebrada de Humahuaca Solar Train (Spanish: Tren Solar de la Quebrada de Humahuaca) is a 42 km (26.1 mi) regional tourist service that operates between the cities of Volcán and Tilcara in Jujuy Province, Argentina. The train service operates within the Quebrada de Humahuaca, a UNESCO World Heritage Site since 2003 and uses the General Belgrano Railway's Ramal C that extends from Santa Fe and La Quiaca.

This branch, if it worked in its entirely, would have an economic importance as it would connect the Argentine ports with the Bolivian railway network apart from the source of touristic income for Jujuy Province so it extends alongside the Quebrada de Humahuaca, reaching regional cities such as Volcán, Purmamarca, and Tilcara.

The service, formerly operated by state-owned Ferrocarriles Argentinos, is operated by the Government of Jujuy Province, and is the first solar train in the Americas, and the second in the world after the Byron Bay Train. Originally scheduled to be inaugurated in December 2023, then in March 2024, the Government of Jujuy finally delayed the opening of the service, which was inaugurated in June 2024.

== History ==
=== Origins and first concession ===
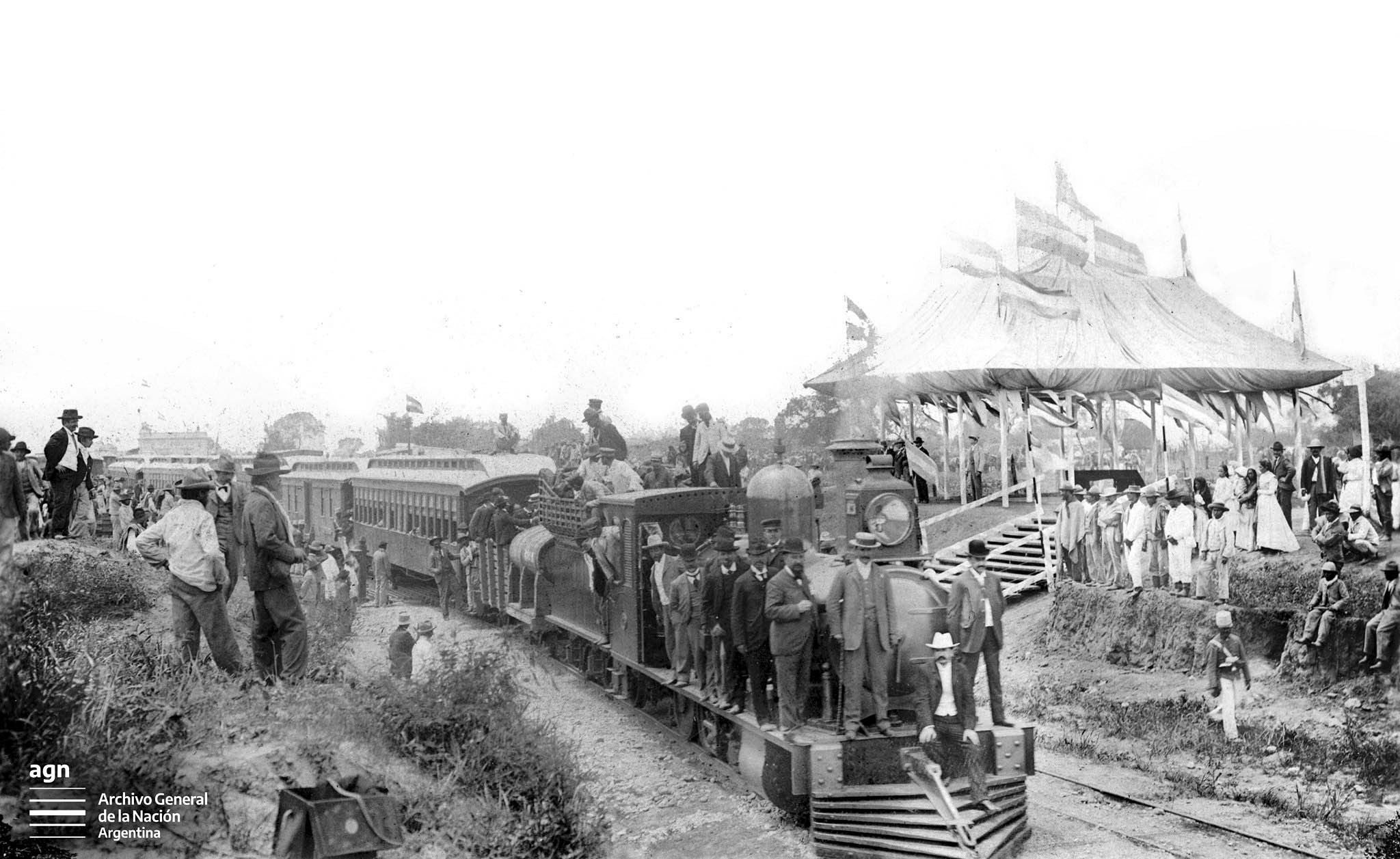
Inaugural trip to Bolivia in early 1900s. The line was built by the Central Northern Railway

Since its inauguration at the beginning of the XX century in the Jujuy-La Quiaca branch, the line (built and operated by the Central Northern Railway of the Argentine State Railway, reaching La Quiaca in 1891) was served by several passenger and freight trains from Buenos Aires and La Paz, Bolivia. When the entire railway network was nationalized in Argentina, the FCCN became part of the Belgrano Railway and operated by recently formed Ferrocarriles Argentinos.

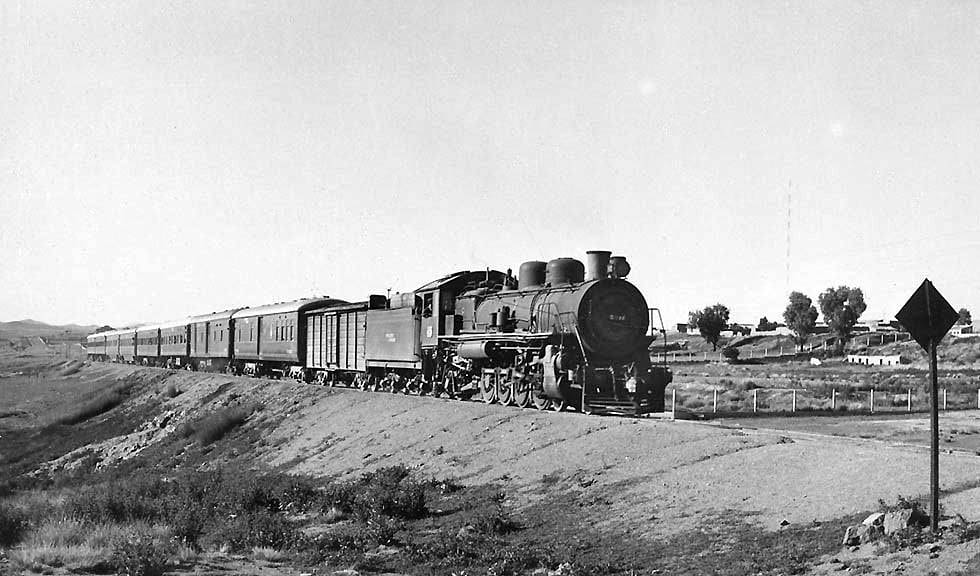
Freight train operated by defunct "Ferrocarriles Argentinos" en route to Bolivia

During the process when the administration led by Carlos Menem privatised the entire railway network in Argentina, in March 1993 all the long-distance services formerly operated by Ferrocarriles Argentinos were closed or transferred to some provincial government. Privatisation was ultimately reversed in 2015 with the creation of Nuevos Ferrocarriles Argentinos.

Two years later, the national government granted Jujuy Province the Jujuy-La Quiaca branch for a period of 30 years, endorsed by provincial law nº 5,144. Although the province had committed to maintain the branch's infrastructure, it was abandoned and subsecquently deteriorated due to lack of maintenance. Damages included rail tracks theft, bridges washed away after flooding, and even buildings intruded.

=== Project resumed ===
In 2016 the government of Jujuy led by Gerardo Morales announced a project to reactivate the branch, which would be similar to Tren de las Nubes. The project included the refurbishment of part of the 300 km length of the San Salvador de Jujuy-La Quiaca line (inaugurated in 1908). Works began in 2017, with Trenes Argentinos Infraestructura donating 86,000 m of rail tracks and 60,000 sleepers, with the rest of costs and manpower being borne by the province.

The First stage of placement of tracks and sleepers began in 2018, with 7 km within four months, with the aim of completing 17 km at the end of that year. Nevertheless, by May 2019 only 10 km had been completed.

=== Route changes ===
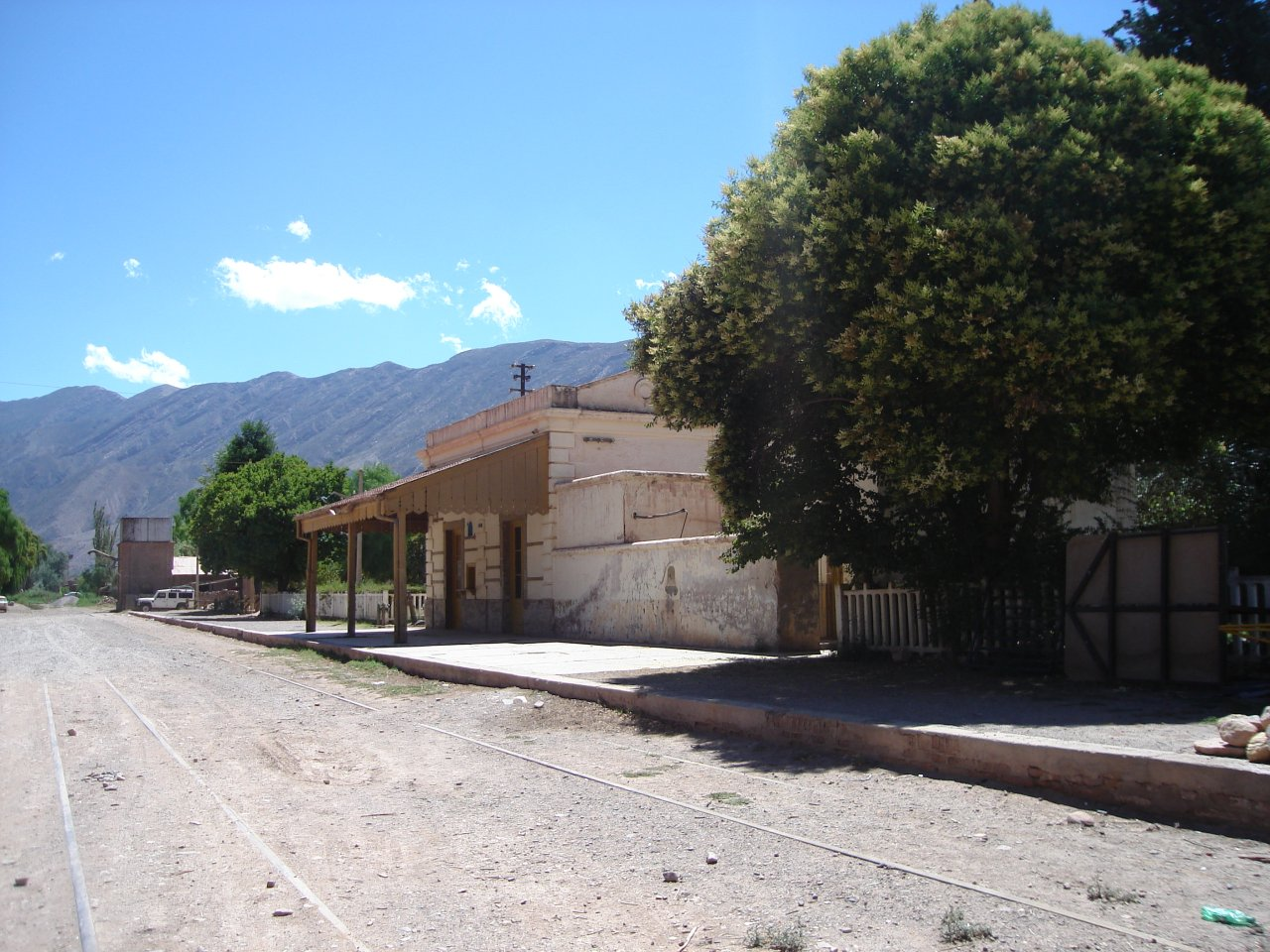
Tilcara station in 2009

At the end of 2021 the government of Jujuy relaunched the project with a substantially shorter route than the original 300 km length. The new project included only the route from Volcán to Tilcara (42 km). A term of 24 months was set for works, at an estimated cost of AR$1,300 million. The Governor of Jujuy, Gerardo Morales, stated that trains would be propelled by photovoltaic solar energy, also mentioning that other alternatives could be lithium battery, hydrogen, or electricity.

By March 2023 the project was 70% completed, with 35 km of tracks and 8 (out of 9) bridges finished. Other works included the refurbishment of the stations, adding a coffee house (confitería) to Volcán and Tumbaya becoming a railway museum.

== Rolling stock ==
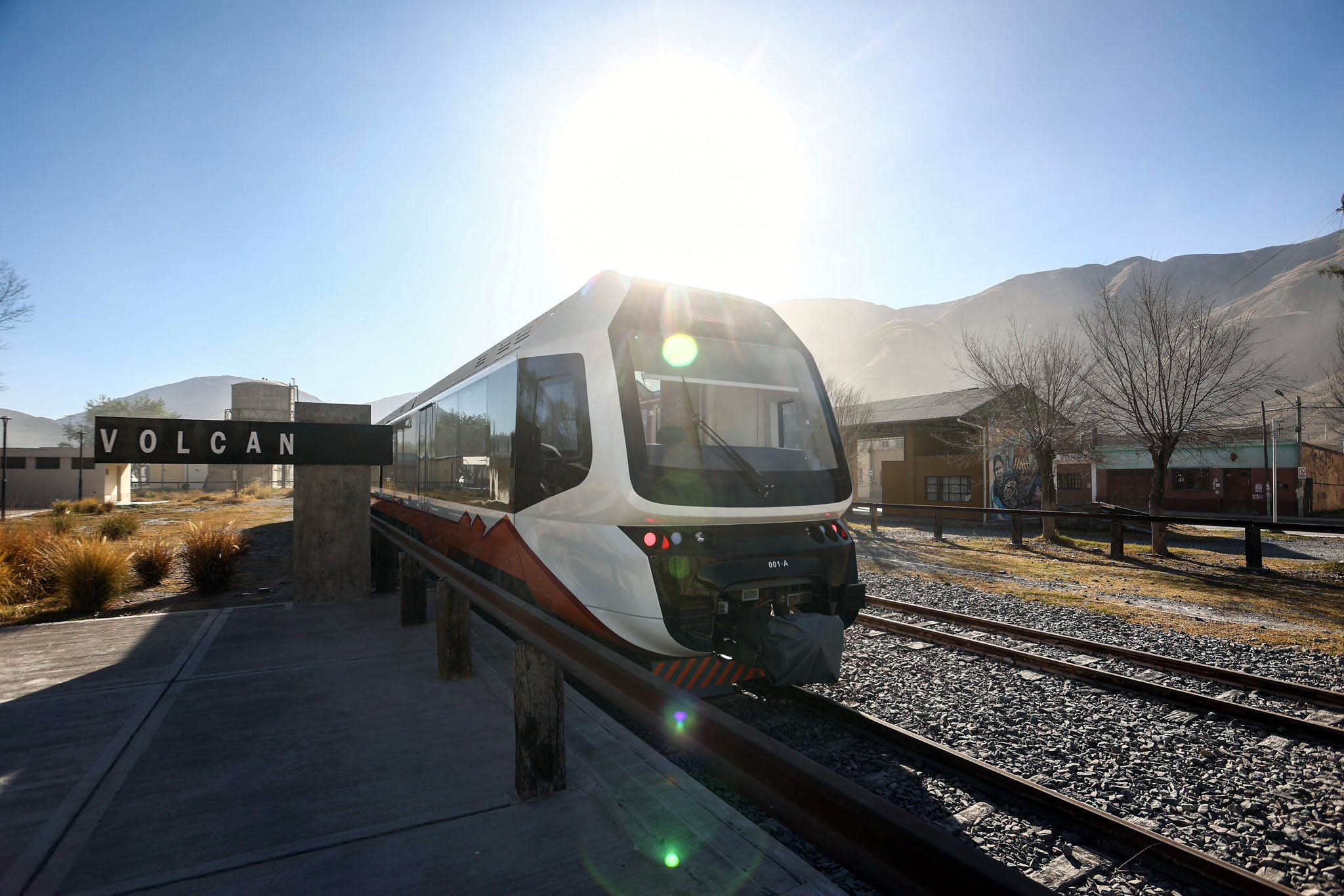
CRRC EMU at Volcán station in 2024

Although the original intention was the multiple units were propelled by photovoltaic solar energy, in May 2022 the government of Jujuy acquired two battery electric units from Chinese manufacturer CRRC Tangshan. The train batteries are charged with solar energy. Each unit has 70 seats and can reach a maximum speed of 60 kilometres per hour (37 mph).

The local government also announced that train batteries would be recharged at solar energy plants located in the Quebrada de Humahuaca. The Chinese company had also provided the diesel railcars serving on the Belgrano Sur Line.

== Service ==
Trains run with four services per day from 8:00 to 20:00, with an estimated travel time of 2 hours between the two termini. The train ticket allows multiple train rides during the same day, allowing passengers to visit the towns before continuing on the next train.

It is planned that the route extends from Tilcara to Humahuaca, with a third stage from Humahuaca to La Quiaca.
