= Battery train =

Battery train may refer to:

- Battery electric multiple unit
  - Accumulator railcar
  - Drumm Battery Train
- Battery locomotive
- Model railway
- Ultra light rail
  - Coventry Very Light Rail
