= Battery electric multiple unit =

Zero-emissions unwired train

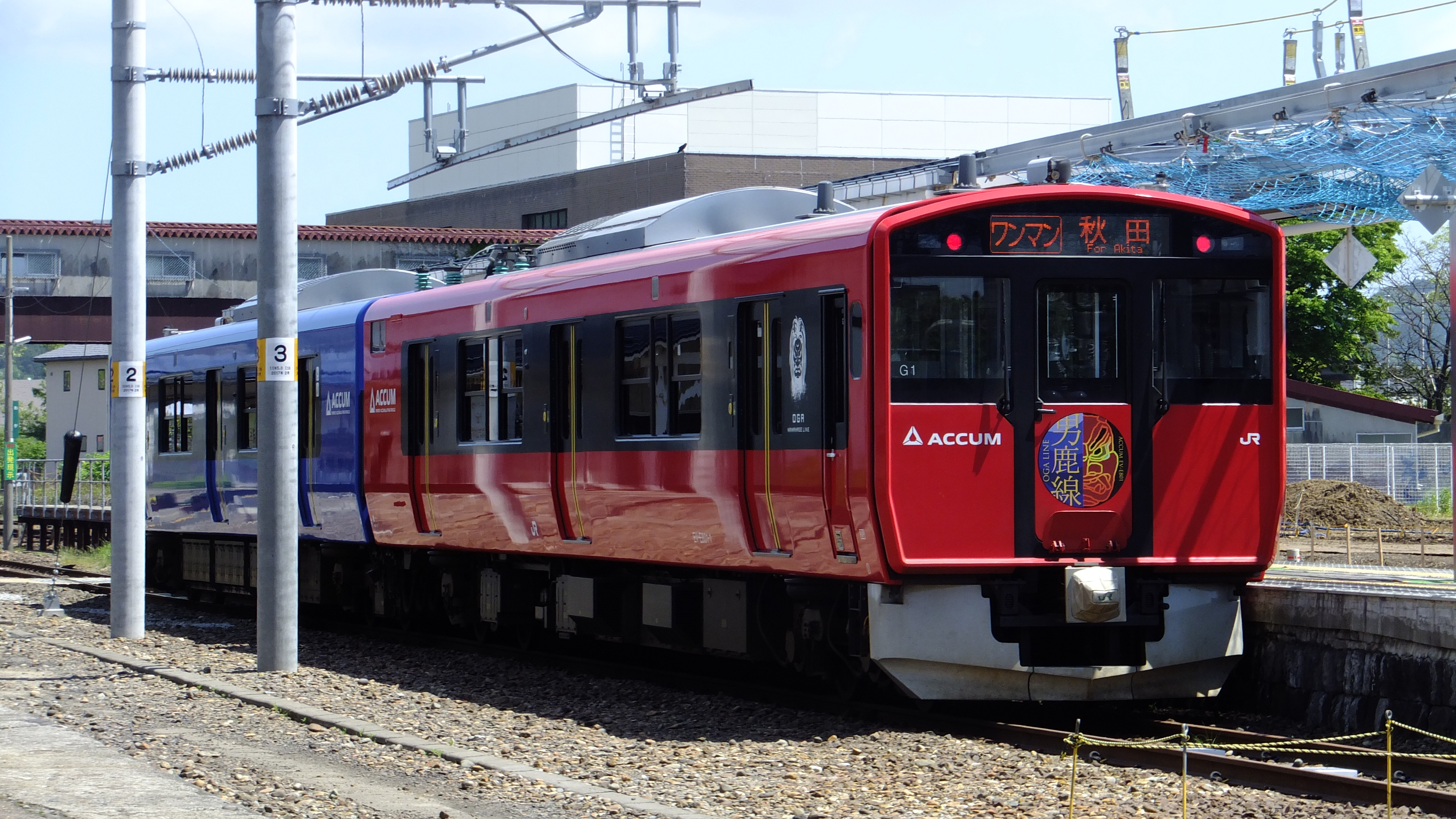
The Japanese lead the world in battery trains with at least 23 battery electric multiple units in regular operation, replacing diesel multiple units (DMU) on non-electrified routes or non-electrified sections of route.

A battery electric multiple unit (BEMU), battery electric railcar or accumulator railcar is an electric multiple unit or railcar whose energy can be supplied from rechargeable batteries driving the traction motors.

Prime advantages of these vehicles is that they do not use fossil fuels such as coal or diesel fuel, emit no exhaust gases and do not require the railway to have expensive continuous infrastructure like electric third rail or overhead catenary. On the down side is the weight of the batteries, which raises the vehicle weight, affecting the range before recharging of between 300 and 600 kilometres (186 and 373 mi). Currently, battery electric units have a higher purchase price and running costs than petrol or diesel railcars. One or more charging stations are required along the routes they operate, unless operation is on a mixture of electrified and unelectrified track, with the batteries being charged from the electrified track.

Battery technology has greatly improved since the beginning of the 21st century, broadening the scope of use of battery trains, moving away from limited niche applications. Vivarail in the United Kingdom claim their trains have a range of 100 miles (160 km) on only battery power, with a 10-minute charging time. These sorts of ranges and battery recharging times greatly widen the scope of use of battery or battery-electric trains. Despite higher purchase, on certain railway lines battery trains are economically viable as the very high cost and maintenance of full line electrification is eliminated. Previously, incorporating lightly used unelectrified lines into an electrified network meant extending expensive electrical infrastructure, making many extensions unviable. Modern battery-electric trains have the ability to operate on both types of track. A number of metro networks around the world have extended electrified metro lines using battery-electric technology, with a number of networks considering the option.

From March 2014, passenger battery trains have been in operation in Japan on a number of lines. Austria has overhead wire/battery trains which became operational in 2019. Britain successfully trialled fare paying passenger hybrid overhead wire/lithium battery trains in January and February 2015.

According to a 2019 analysis by VDE e.V., on a line run more frequently than approximately every 24 to 30 minutes, BEMU is more expensive than electrifying the line and running standard EMUs; for lines run less frequently than this threshold, BEMU is cheaper.

== History ==
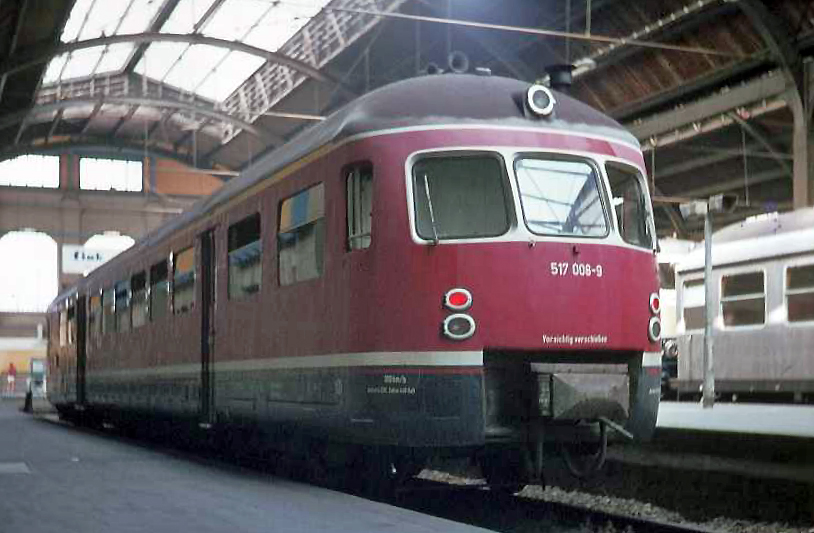
Railcar no. 517 008 of the German national railway, DB

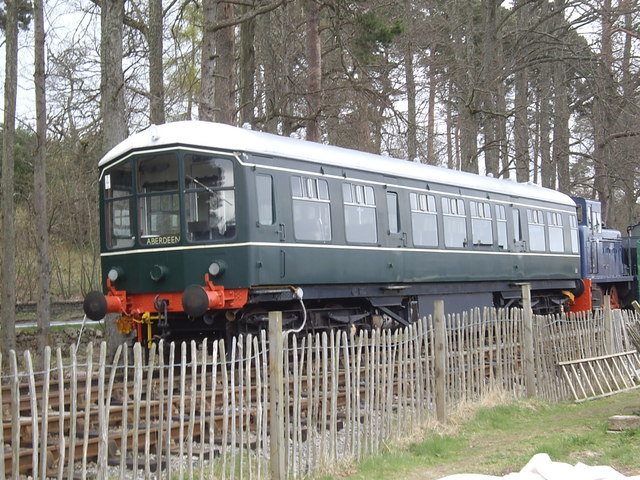
British Rail BEMU, operationally fare paying from 1955 to 1966, now acting as a shunting train

Experiments with accumulator railcars, as they were originally called, were conducted from around 1890 in Belgium, France, Germany, and Italy. Full implementation of battery trains were undertaken with various degrees of success. In the U.S., railcars of the Edison-Beach type, with nickel-iron batteries were used from 1911. In New Zealand, a battery-electric Edison railcar with a range of 160 km (99 mi) operated from 1926 to 1934 on the 34 km (21 mi) long Little River Branch line. The Drumm nickel-zinc battery was used on four 2-car sets between 1932 and 1949 on the Harcourt Street Line in Ireland. British Railways used lead-acid batteries in a British Rail BEMU from 1958 to 1966 on the 38 mile long Aberdeen to Ballater line in Scotland. The BEMU was a success, but decommissioned as the line was closed. A BEMU has been restored operating as a shunting train until proper battery charging facilities are built. In Germany between 1955 and 1995 Deutsche Bahn railways successfully operated 232 DB Class ETA 150 railcars utilising lead-acid batteries.

== Supercapacitors ==
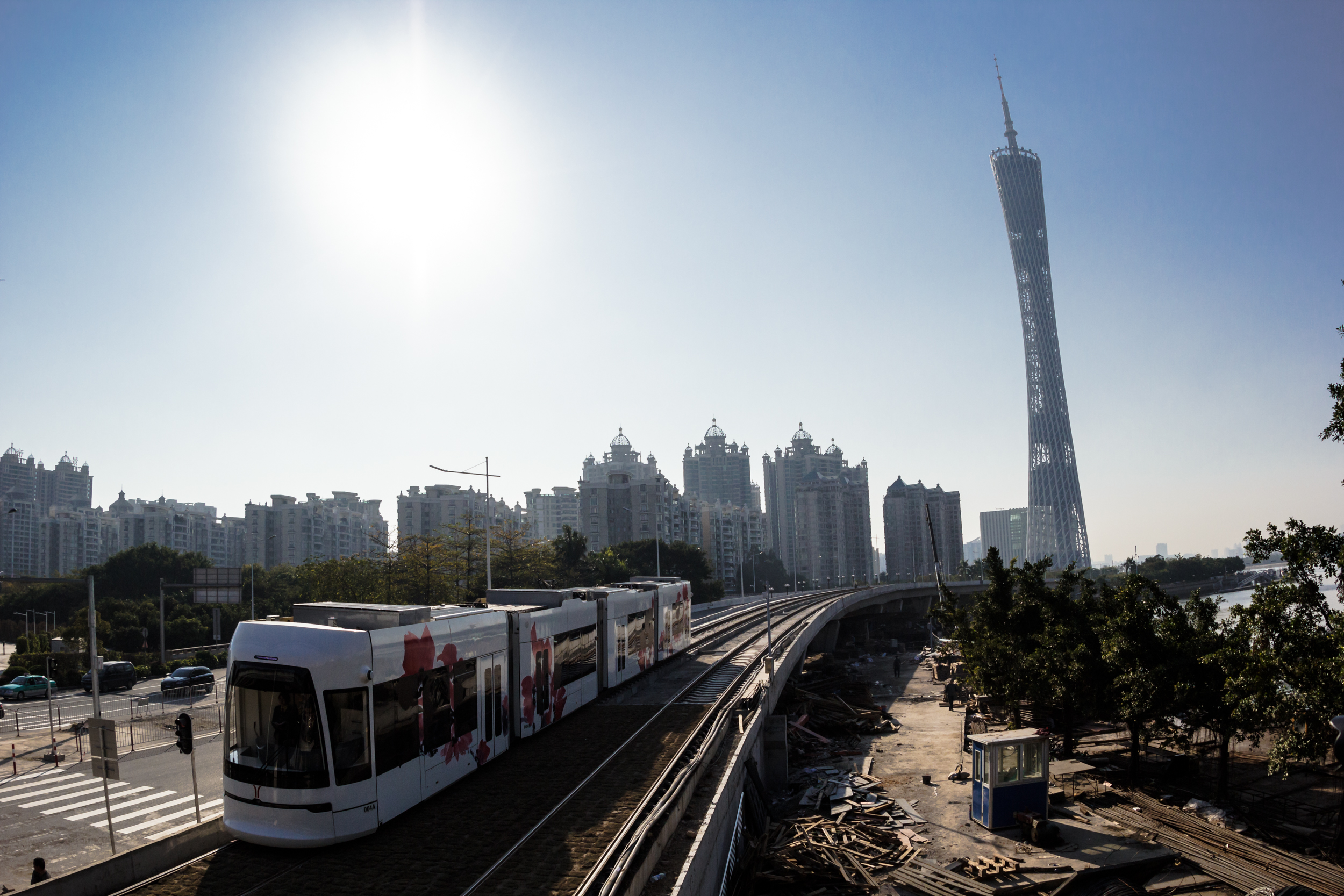
Supercapacitor trams on the Haizhu Tram in Guangzhou

A number of tramway manufacturers are offering battery tramcars that combine the traction battery with a supercapacitor that will be charged at each stop. The main motivation for the usage of battery-powered tramways is to avoid railway electrification system installation. Using boost charging at each stop allows to lower the size of the required traction battery. This technology is hoped to be transferred to full trains.

The CAF Urbos 3 tramways was ordered for the Seville MetroCentro with the Acumulador de Carga Rápida system which uses short overhead wires at each stop for charging. The Seville trams have been operating since Easter 2011.

Siemens three car trams are to be used for Education City in Doha, the capital of Qatar. The network opened in 2010. No overhead wires were installed, as the 10 Avenio trams will be powered by the Siemens Sitras HES system (Hybrid Energy Storage), a combination of a supercapacitor and a traction battery that are charged at each stop through an overhead conductor rail.

A Combino tramway using four car tramsets equipped with the Sitras HES system has been in regular service from Almada to Seixal, Portugal, since November 2008. It is capable of running up to distances of 2,500 metres (2,700 yd) without overhead wires.

A number of catenary-free tramways have opened in China that recharge at tram stops and terminals. The 20.3 km (12.6 mi) Huai'an tram line in China, opened in February 2016. The line is entirely catenary-free utilising battery-powered trams supplied by CRRC Zhuzhou which recharge at tram stops.

== By country ==
=== Argentina ===
The Quebrada de Humahuaca Solar Train (Spanish: Tren Solar de la Quebrada de Humahuaca) is a 42 km (26.1 mi) regional tourist service that operates between the cities of Volcán and Tilcara in Jujuy Province, Argentina. The train service operates within the Quebrada de Humahuaca, a UNESCO World Heritage Site.

The service, formerly operated by state-owned Ferrocarriles Argentinos, is operated by the Government of Jujuy Province, and is the first solar train in the Americas, and the second in the world after the Byron Bay Train. The train line was inaugurated in June 2024.

Although the original intention was the multiple units were propelled by photovoltaic solar energy, in May 2022 the government of Jujuy acquired two battery electric units to Chinese manufacturer CRRC Tangshan. The train batteries are charged with solar energy. Each unit has 70 seats and can reach a maximum speed of 60 kilometres per hour (37 mph).

The local Government also announced that train batteries would be recharged at solar energy plants located in the Quebrada de Humahuaca.

=== Australia ===
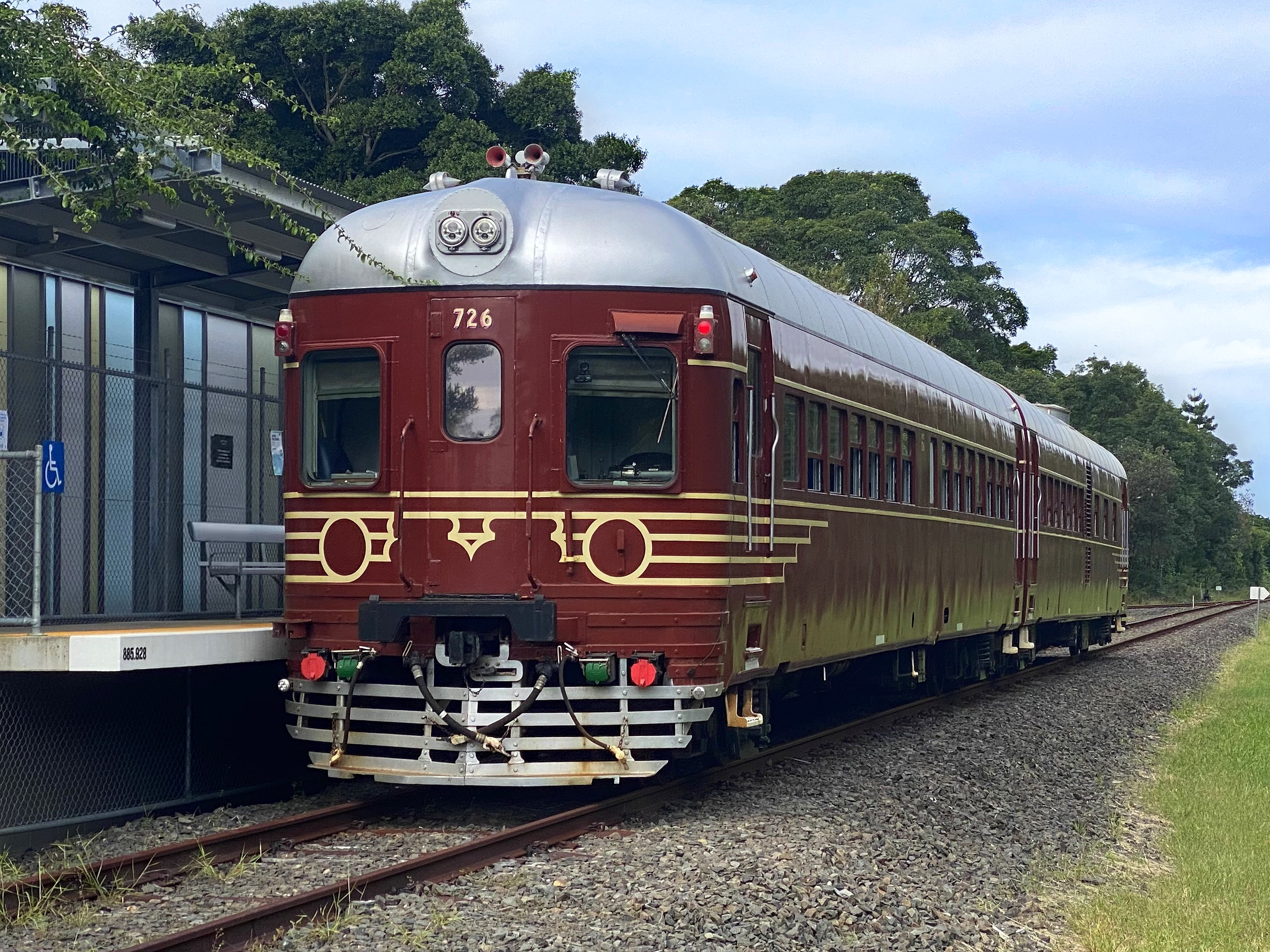
The solar-powered Byron Bay Train in Byron Bay, Australia

The Byron Bay Train service in Byron Bay, New South Wales operates a heritage 600 class railcar. The railcar was formerly diesel powered which was operational from 1949 to 1994. The railcar had the diesel equipment stripped out with electric traction motors fitted, being converted to solar power using a battery set to store solar generated energy from the cars' roof panels. The solar train came into operational use on a formerly disused section of line through Byron Bay in 2017. It is believed to be the world's first solar-powered train.

CAF Urbos 3 supercapacitor powered trams operate on the Newcastle Light Rail network with trams being recharged at each stop. The Canberra and Parramatta light rail networks are also planning to introduce battery powered CAF Urbos 3 vehicles on their networks. They will operate on battery power on select parts of their networks.

=== Austria ===
The Austrian Federal Railways has purchased 189 Siemens Desiro ML trains from 2013 to 2020. One of these trains was converted to a battery electric multiple unit and branded as cityjet eco. The battery-electric version of the Siemens train is equipped to operate with batteries and overhead wires, with a battery only range of 80 km (50 mi) reaching a maximum speed of 100 km/h (62 mph) in battery mode. The trains are to be tested on regional and suburban rail lines on electrified and unelectrified track. The test services began in September 2019 on the Kamp Valley line between Horn and St. Pölten.

=== Cuba ===
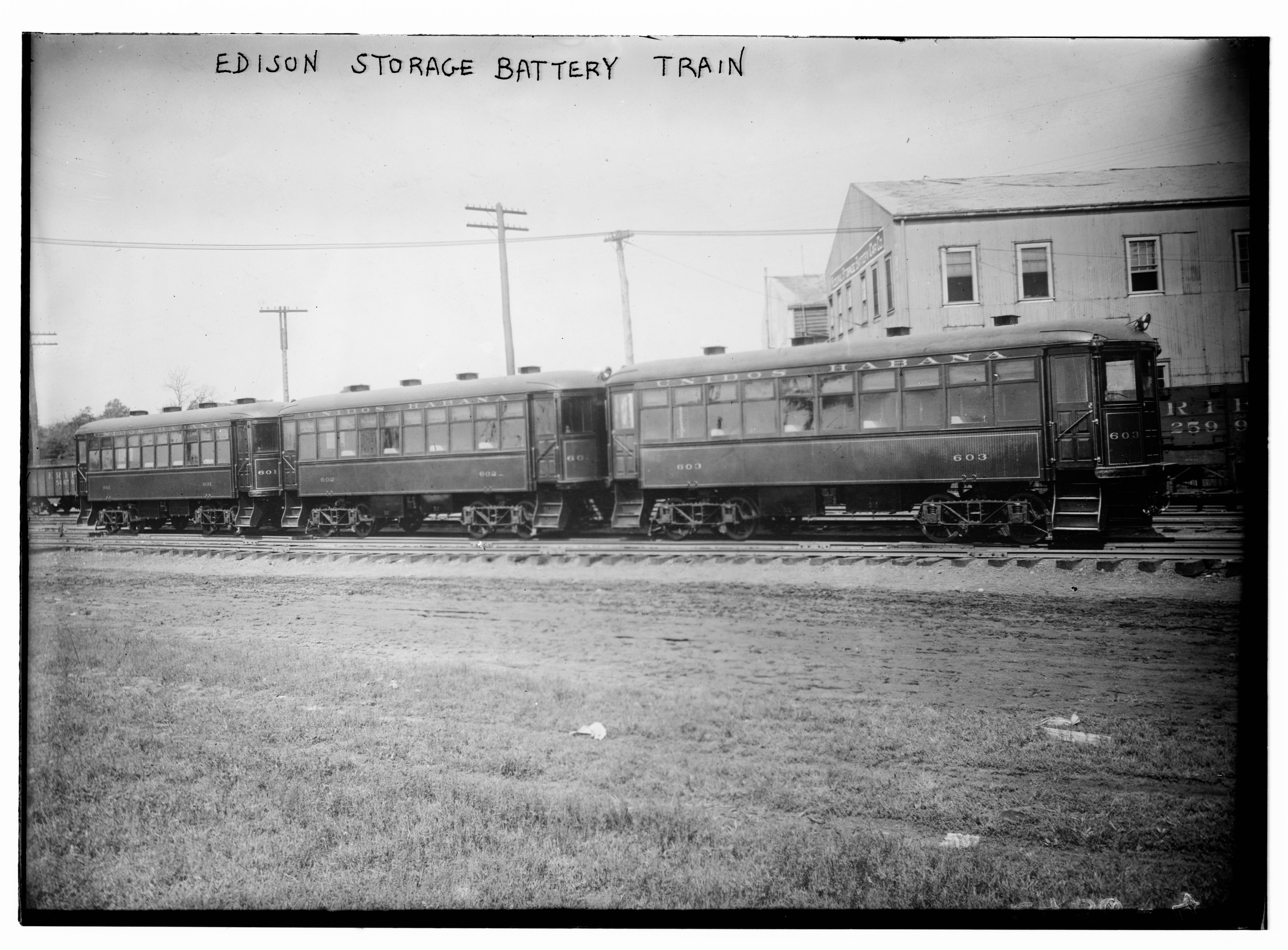
Edison storage battery train for Havana

In 1912, the United Railways of Havana ordered a battery railcar by Thomas Edison and Ralph H. Beach.

=== Croatia ===
For the needs of the national railway company Croatian Railways the KONČAR Group and their subdivision of KONČAR – Electric Vehicles is developing units of BEMU and BMU. First units entered use in 2025, with BEMU in May 2025, and BMU in September 2025. BEMU units, capacity of 304 passengers, seating 157, have a possibility to run on overhead line 25kV/50 Hz or on battery power with 631 kWh of storage. BMU units, capacity of 216 passengers, seating 113, run on battery power with 736 kWh of storage. Manufacturer also provides charging stations with 1MW power output.

=== Denmark ===
From the end of 2020, Stadler FLIRT Akku battery trains would be trialled on two lines, the 25 km (16 mi) Helsingør to Hillerød line in Northern Sjælland, and the 18 km (11 mi) Lemvig line in Northwestern Julland. The trains were planned for 2024, but the Lemvig Line started operating the first Siemens Mireo battery train in late 2025.

=== France ===
In January 2021, Bombardier signed a new contract to retrofit and introduce a pre-series of five AGC battery-operated trains by 2023, in collaboration with SNCF and five French regions including Auvergne-Rhône-Alpes, Hauts-de-France, Nouvelle-Aquitaine, Occitanie and Provence-Alpes-Côte d'Azur. The 5 AGC trains will be modified into battery-operated to help decarbonise French rail transport. The idea is to convert dual-mode (catenary and diesel-powered) high capacity self-propelled trains to dual-mode battery-powered AGCs. This project offers a proof of concept and a way forward to eliminating diesel trains by 2035, a target set by the French government and SNCF.

=== Germany ===
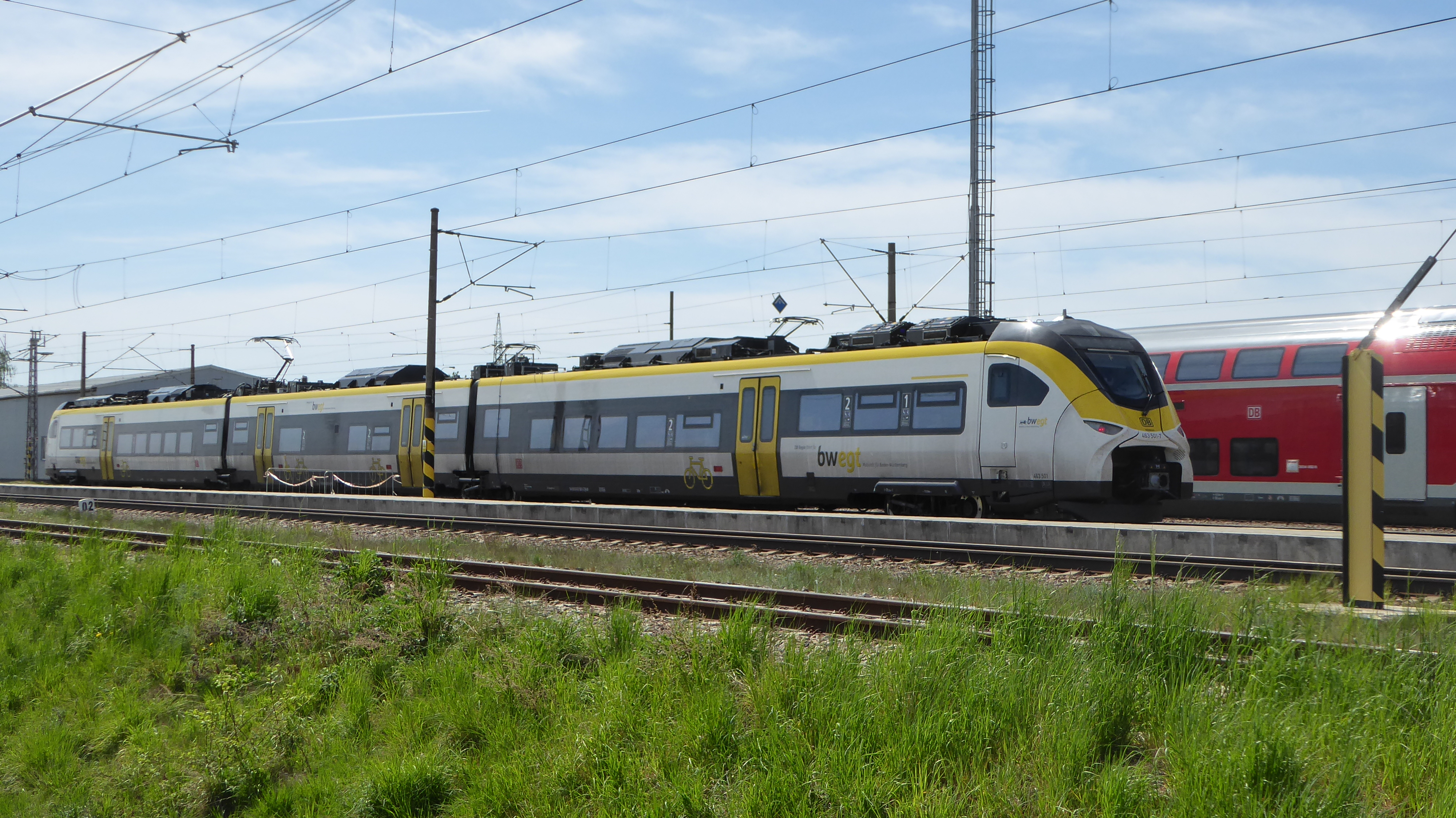
Operating in Germany, Siemens Mireo Plus B battery–overhead-wire trains, with a range of 80 km in battery-only operation

In 1887, the first German accumulator railcars were placed in service by the Royal Bavarian State Railways.

By 2040, Deutsche Bahn plans (as of 2026) to replace all diesel locomotives with zero-emission trains. According to calculations by the Technical University of Berlin, there are about 250 battery-powered trains operating in Germany (2026), and 450 are expected to operate by 2030.

==== DB Class ETA ====
Pre-Second World War classes ETA 177 to 180. The post-war DB Class ETA 176 (later 517) and finally ended with DB Class ETA 150 (later 515). The latter were used until 1995 having been since modernised into the Nokia ETA, painted light grey and green and deployed onto the so-called Nokia Railway (timetable number RB 46), nowadays the Glückauf-Bahn from Gelsenkirchen via Wanne-Eickel to Bochum.

==== Stadler Flirt Akku ====
In July 2019, the Schleswig-Holstein rail authority NAH.SH awarded Stadler a €600m order for 55 battery-powered Flirt Akku multiple unit trains along with maintenance for 30 years. The trains, which offer 150 km (93 mi) of battery range, were planned to start entering service in 2022 replacing DMUs on non-electrified routes. Finally, the SH-XMU program inaugurated the trainsets in increments between 2023 and 2025.

==== Siemens Mireo Plus B ====
The five routes of: Offenburg to Freudenstadt/Hornberg, Offenburg to Bad Griesbach, Offenburg to Achern, Achern to Ottenhöfen and Biberach (Baden) to Oberharmersbach-Riersbach started to operate from April 2024 on electrified and unelectrified track, the 120 seat Siemens Mireo Plus B battery-powered/overhead power line trains. On only battery operation the trains have a range of 80 kilometers (50 mi).

In October 2026, the Lower Saxony Regional Transit Authority (LNVG - de:Landesnahverkehrsgesellschaft Niedersachsen) has ordered 83 trains, and the Greater Braunschweig Regional Association (de:Regionalverband Großraum Braunschweig) has ordered 30 trains (Mireo Plus B battery-powered trains). Siemens Mobility reported that the contract — which includes not only the battery-powered trains but also maintenance and depots — is worth two billion euros. Mobility CEO Michael Peters described it as the “world’s largest order for battery-powered trains.”
The 113 trains ordered are scheduled to enter service at the end of 2031. According to Siemens, there is an option to order up to 132 additional trains on demand.

=== Georgia ===
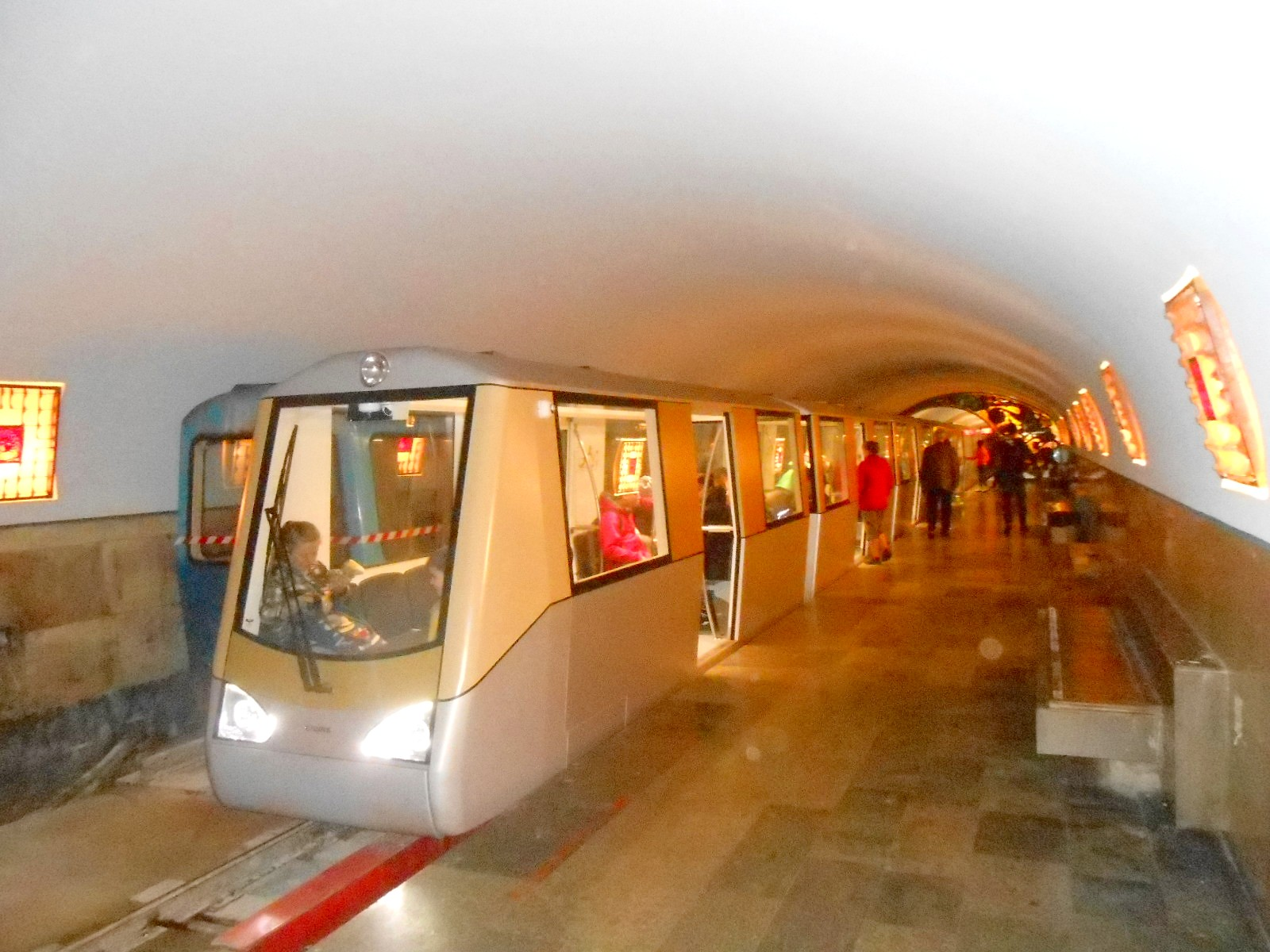
Ep-563 train at Anakopea station, New Athos Cave Railway in Georgia

The New Athos Cave Railway in Abkhazia in the country of Georgia has three narrow-gauge power-concentrated battery electric multiple units built by the Railroad Machinery Plants of Riga in Latvia. Two Ep «Tourist» trains were built in 1975 and later modernized in 2005 and 2009, and the new Ep-563 train was built in 2014. Since 2014, this has been the only train in use. The first Ep train is based at Anakopea station for doubling the Ep 563 train in case of malfunction. Another Ep train is based at the depot. Each train consists of 6 cars, including 1 power car with driver's cab, motors and power equipment and 5 trailer cars for passengers (4 intermediate cars and 1 observation car in the end). Both models can run either on a third rail with 300 V DC or batteries with 240V DC being used for short unelectrified sections at switches without a third rail, and also at passenger stations where the third rail has no voltage for safety reasons.

=== Ireland ===
A petrol railcar was converted to battery power by the Great Southern Railways in 1930, on a trial basis. Following its success, between 1932 and 1949, two battery electric trains ran successfully between Dublin and Bray. Two additional trains were built and placed into service in 1939, also running until 1949. The train's batteries were charged at each terminus via an overhead pickup. The train could reach 65 mph or 105 km/h, though service speeds were typically limited to 41 mph or 66 km/h.

In 2019, Iarnród Éireann announced they would purchase 250 new carriages, with an option of up to 600, over a 10-year period, for use on the DART network. The order will consist of both electric multiple units and battery electric multiple units. These units will be used on the non-electrified line between Malahide and Drogheda, with three charging units to be installed at the latter location.

=== Japan ===
==== N700S bullet train ====
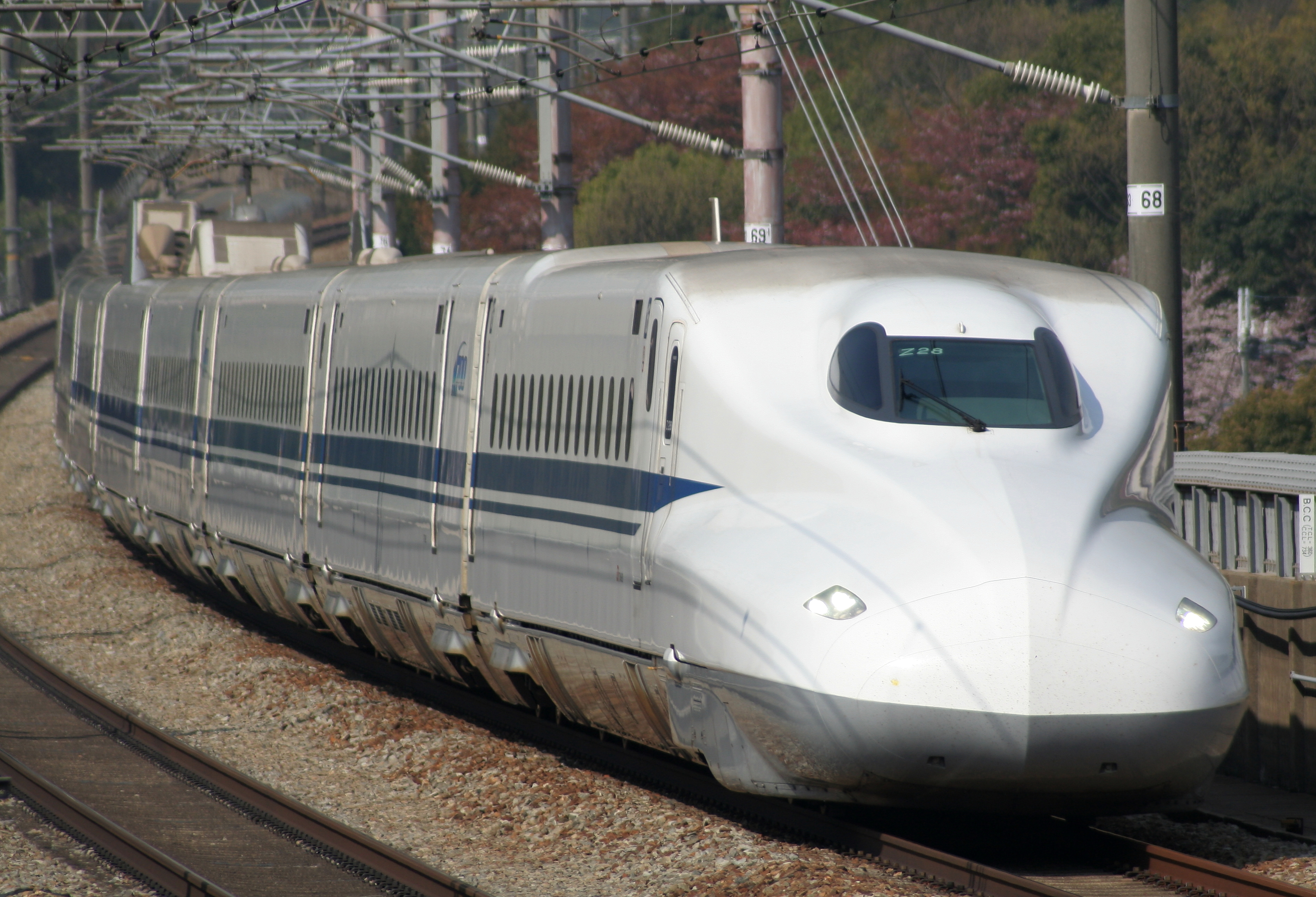
N700 bullet train with battery backup.

The N700S train had battery backup introduced in June 2020. The batteries can power the train at low speed to the nearest station when power outages or other emergencies occur. The train operates on the Tokaido Shinkansen/Sanyo Shinkansen lines between Tokyo and Hakata.

==== NE Train Smart Denchi-kun ====
In Japan, JR East tested a "NE Train Smart Denchi-kun" battery electric railcar from 2009. This vehicle is capable of operating either under 1,500 V DC overhead wires or on battery power alone for a distance of up to 50 km on tracks without an overhead power supply. The batteries can be charged via the pantograph while running on tracks with an overhead wires or at a specially built recharging facility at a station.

==== EV-E301 series ====
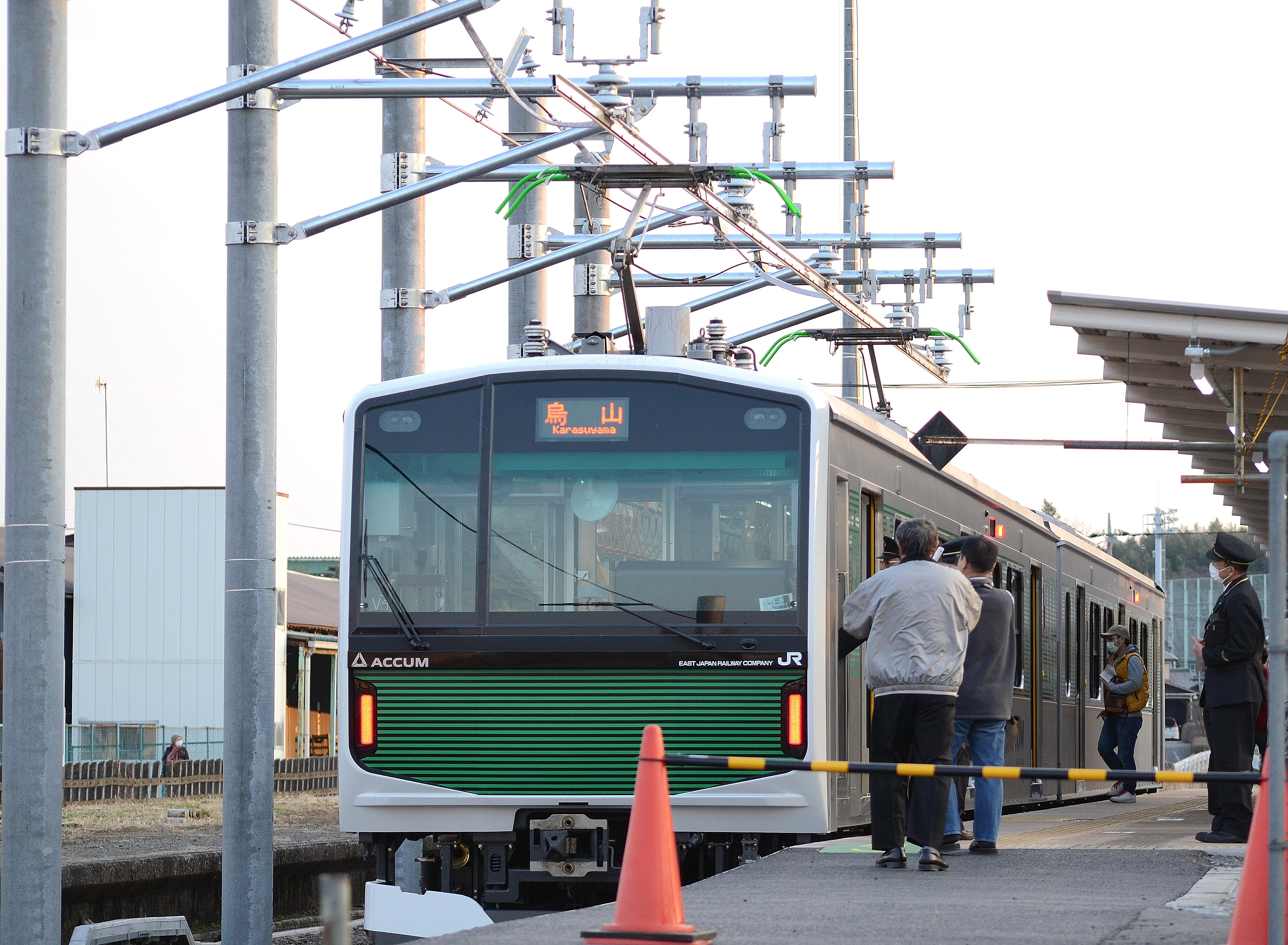
EV-E301 charging from the overhead conductor bar

From March 2014, JR East introduced the EV-E301 series, with 1,500 V DC overhead wire and battery power capability using a two-car battery electric multiple unit, into revenue-earning service on the 20 km (12 mi) long non-electrified Karasuyama Line.

Since March 4, 2017, battery electric trains have completely replaced diesel multiple units on this route. There are four two-car sets in operation, each set equipped with a 190 kWh lithium-ion battery.

The trains recharge their batteries at Karasuyama Station terminus via their pantographs, using a rigid conductor bar to facilitate rapid charging at 1,500V using power supplied by the local electric grid. At the other end, at Hōshakuji, the Karasuyama Line meets the electrified Tohoku Main Line, and trains use that electrified line to continue to Utsunomiya Station.

==== BEC819 series ====
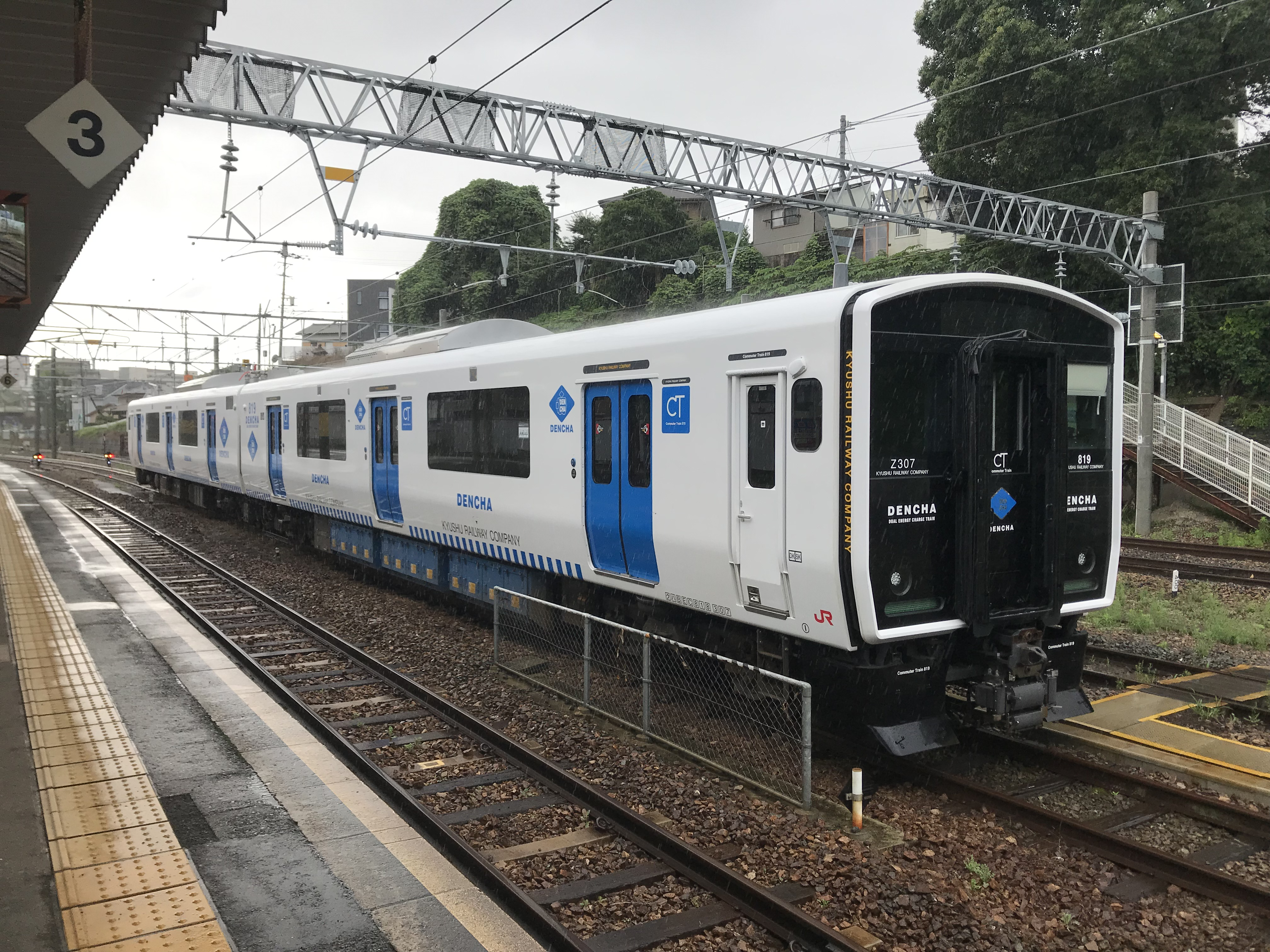
BEC819 at Kashii Station

From April 2016, JR Kyushu started trial operation of a two-car BEC819 series BEMU trainset built by Hitachi, nicknamed "DENCHA", on part of the Chikuhō Main Line, with six more trains planned to be introduced on the line in spring 2017. It can be powered via overhead AC power line or by using battery capacity of 360 kWh (480 hp⋅h). The trainset became operational on the through services on the Fukuhoku Yutaka Line which is electrified at 20 kV 60 Hz AC and the non-electrified Chikuhō Main Line, also known as the "Wakamatsu Line", between Orio and Wakamatsu in October 2016.

In 2019, a total of 11 new BEC819 trainsets were introduced on the Kashii Line, replacing all diesel multiple units previously operated on that line. This brought the total number of BEC819 trainsets in revenue service to 18.

==== EV-E801 series ====
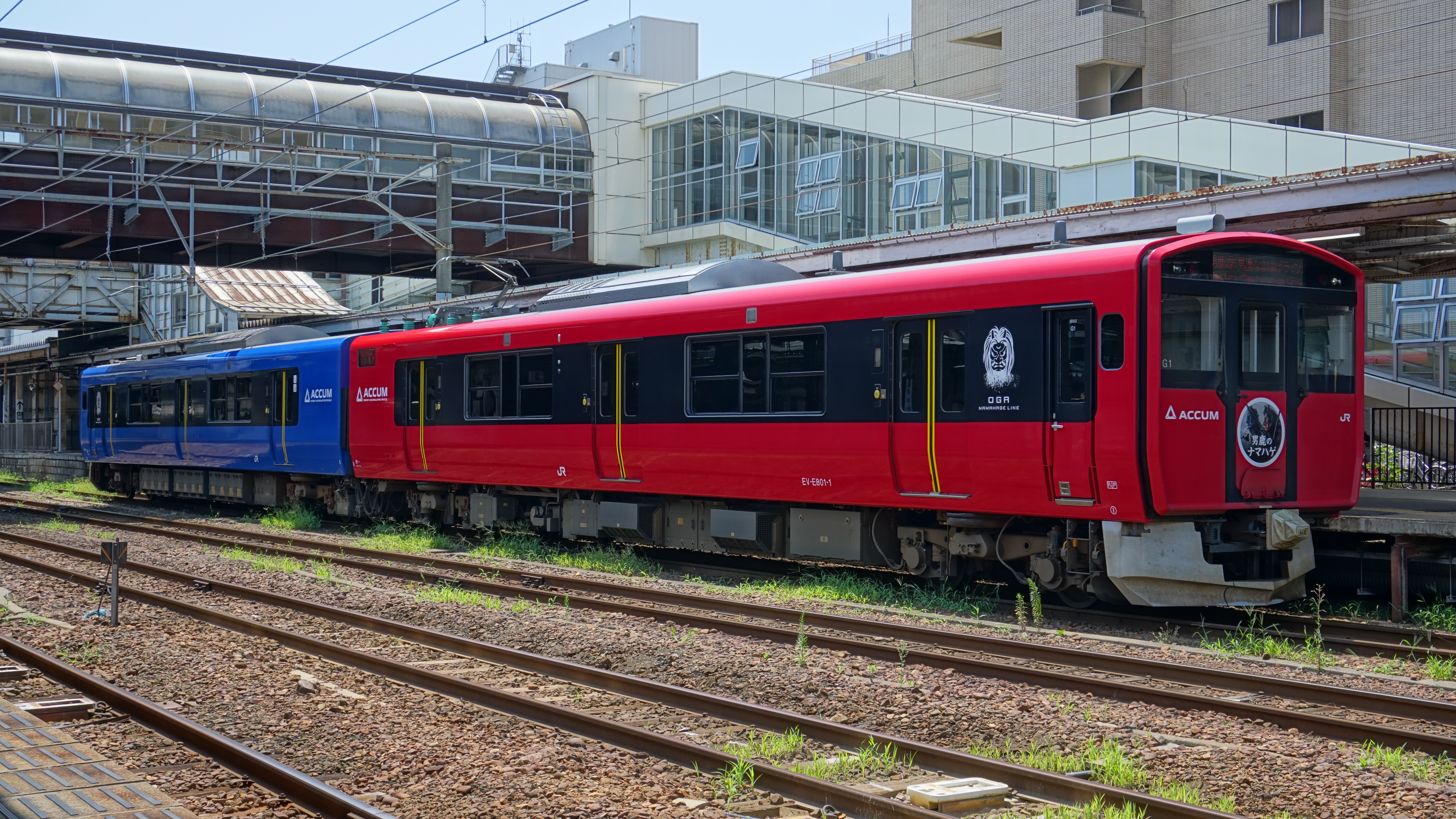
EV-E801 at Oiwake Station, Akita

A new EV-E801 series two-car BEMU train, also built by Hitachi, was introduced on the 26.6 km (16.5 mi) long non-electrified Oga Line in Akita Prefecture in March 2017. It shares similar characteristics with the BEC819 trains as it uses a 360 kWh battery and is recharged from an AC overhead supply, specifically from a 20 kV 50 Hz AC overhead supply. As of March 2021, 6 trainsets have replaced all services on the Oga Line with through services to Akita on the Ōu Main Line.

=== Latvia ===
In 2022, the Road Transport Administration (ATD), which organizes passenger carrier services in Latvia, announced a procurement for the construction and delivery of 9 BEMU sets, with an option for 7 more, until the end of 2026. Stadler, CAF and Škoda Transportation had applied for BEMU deliveries in the first part of the tender. Seven of these trains will be used for the busiest unelectrified railway lines Rīga-Bolderāja and Rīga-Sigulda, with the other two being used on unelectrified routes such as Rīga-Dobele and Rīga-Jēkabpils. These trains will replace the currently-operating DR1A trains on these routes, while the operator remains to be decided by a future procurement.

=== United Kingdom ===
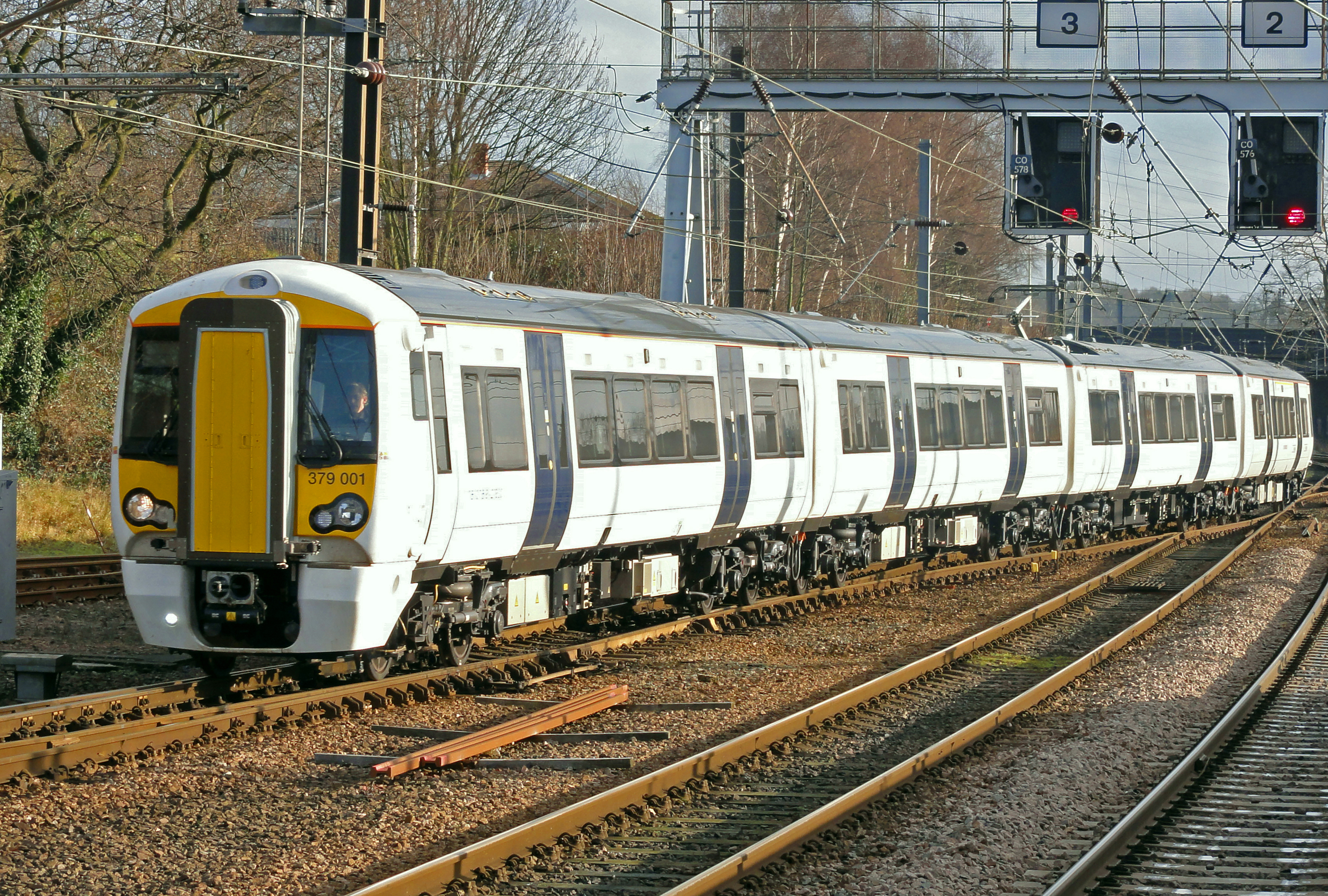
Experimental Electrostar train (a Class 379) converted to run on batteries and overhead wires

Historically, a number of battery electric trains have been used on British railways. The British Rail BEMU was taken out of service because the line from Aberdeen to Ballater in Scotland was closed in 1966. The trains have been renovated being ready for reuse on the Royal Deeside Railway. The British Rail Class 419, a Motor Luggage Van (MLV), was operational from 1959 to 2004, which could run on either on batteries or a third rail, being used for short unelectrified section on quaysides.

The United Kingdom has almost two-thirds, 58%, of the 20,000 mi (32,000 km) rail network on non-electrified track, which consumes 103 million gallons (469 million litres) of diesel each year. Mark Carne of Network Rail, who are responsible for the tracks of the British rail network, in March 2017 stated: "The idea that you need to electrify an entire route is no longer necessarily the case. I think that where we have got hybrid trains, that opens up quite a lot of interesting opportunities for partial electrification." Carne also stated: "technology was advancing at such a pace that better reliability could be achieved without the construction of unsightly overhead cables." He added that developments in batteries are such that it might soon be cost-effective to swap diesel engines for battery or hybrid devices, therefore saving the vast cost of installing power lines above every section of track.

Companies such as UK based Hitachi, Vivarail and Bombardier have committed to or are producing battery-electric trains. These trains will be either new units or conversion of existing units, to fulfil the aims of Network Rail's introduction of battery powered trains.

In January 2015 a one-month trial of a single Class 379 Electrostar fitted with lithium batteries began passenger operations on the Mayflower Line in Essex. The train travelled up to 60 miles (97 km) on energy stored in the batteries also recharging the batteries via the overhead-wires when on electrified sections of the line, at stations and via braking power regeneration. Network Rail refer to this prototype model and its possible future descendants as Independently Powered Electric Multiple Units (IPEMU).

A month after the trial in March 2015, the introduction of battery-powered trains was proposed by Network Rail for consideration for the fifteen station 27 miles (43 km) long diesel operated Wrexham to Bidston, Borderlands Line. The aim is to merge the line into the electric 3rd rail Merseyrail Wirral Line extending into the underground section of Liverpool's city centre, making Wrexham one of the branch terminals of the line. The line is diesel train operated unable to progress into the electric 3rd rail underground Birkenhead and Liverpool Merseyrail tunnels & stations. If battery trains are introduced that are capable of operating in the tunnels, the Borderlands line will be incorporated into the Wirral Line becoming an urban metro line between Liverpool and Wrexham.

The diesel operated trains on the slow Borderlands line terminate at Bidston railway station in Birkenhead, with passengers having to change trains onto the Merseyrail electric network to proceed into Liverpool's centre. Network Rail proposed using dual battery powered/3rd rail pickup rolling stock without full electrification of the line, providing a cheaper method of incorporating the line in the Wirral Line. The trains will only terminate at Wrexham, while at the Liverpool end of the line trains will proceed around the loop of the electrified Liverpool city centre underground tunnels with thirteen station stops. As the train proceeds on the looped electrified line from Bidston and back, the train's batteries are charged.

In September 2026, TransPennine Express ordered 29 battery electric Adessia Stream trains from Alstom, with plans for them to enter service in 2034.

==== Class 777 ====
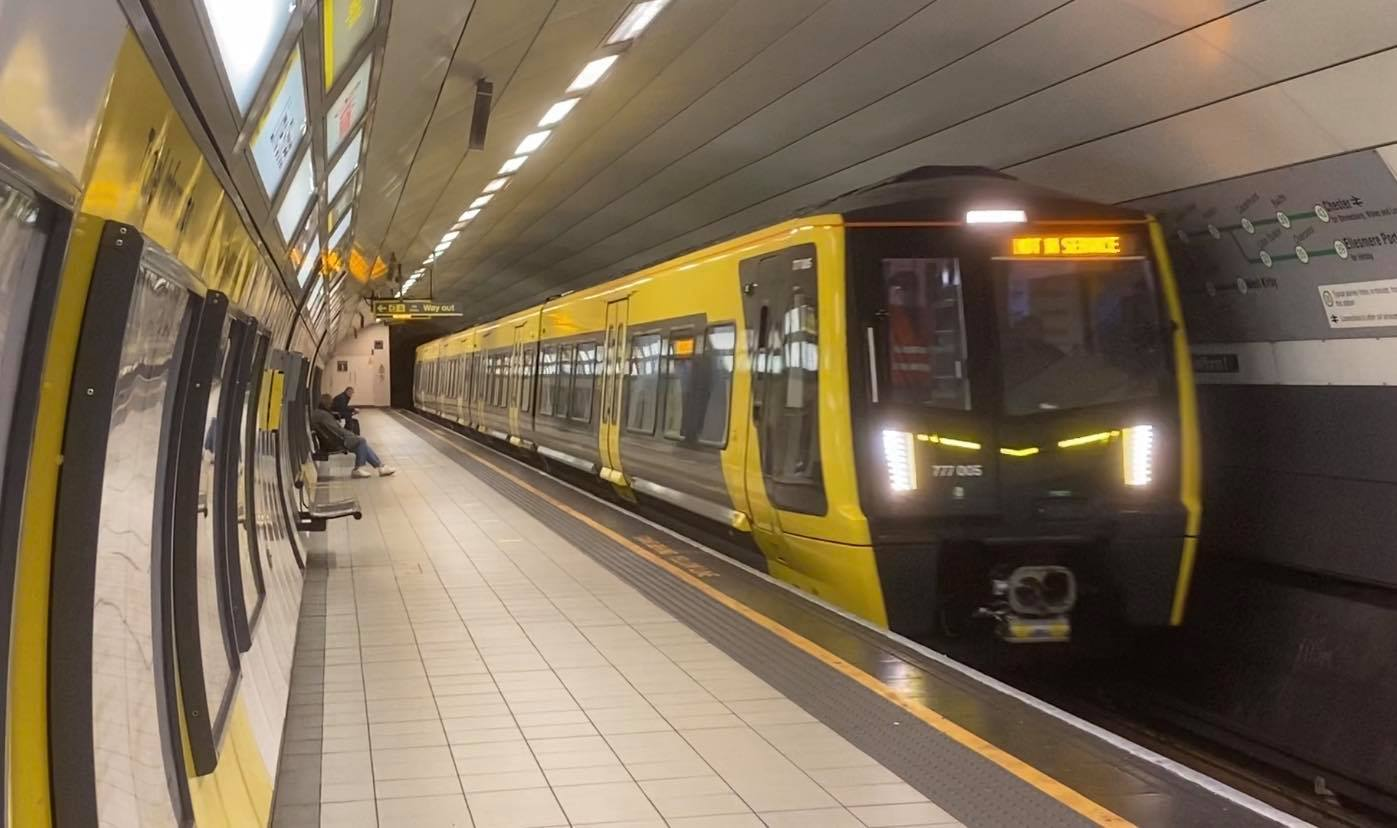
Class 777. Stadler manufactured battery-electric trains in Liverpool.

The Liverpool City Region Combined Authority announced in July 2021 that trials of a BEMU (IPEMU, independent power electric multiple unit) version their new Class 777 on the Merseyrail network had shown that they were capable of travelling up to 20 miles (32 km) without a charge. The battery-electric version of the Class 777 would allow the possibility of Merseyrail services from Liverpool to Skelmersdale, Wrexham, Warrington and Runcorn, without full line electrification. Tests by Stadler achieved 135 km in range.

In October 2023, the hybrid battery electric multiple units entered regular service on Merseyrail from Liverpool Central underground station terminating at Headbolt Lane interchange station. On the section of track from Kirkby to Headbolt Lane trains operate only on energy from onboard batteries.

==== Class 230 ====
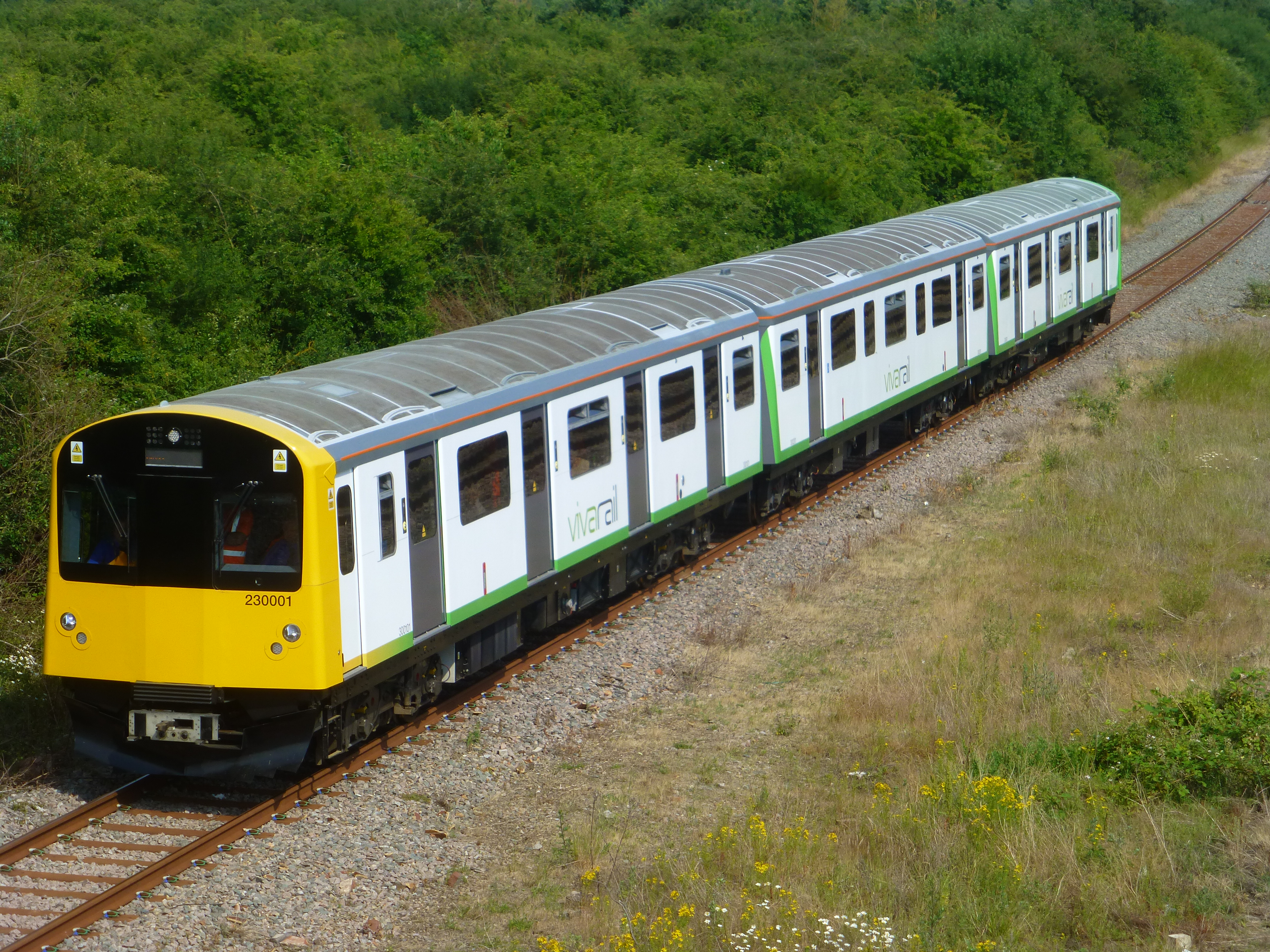
Vivarail battery electric train

Vivarail have produced the Class 230 train which is converted from redundant London Underground D-Stock trains. A demonstrator unit, the two-car 230002, was fitted for diesel-electric- battery power. Vivarail developed a fast charger giving a 100 mi (160 km) range with a 10 minutes recharging time. Power is provided by two lithium-ion batteries per car giving four per train, providing 106 kWh (142 hp⋅h), with an expected life of seven years for the batteries.

In 2017, Vivarail battery trains were being considered for use on the Valley Lines network in South Wales. The trains would be battery powered, capable of being recharged via 25 kV OHLE. The Class 230 was introduced on the Borderlands line for Transport for Wales between Wrexham Central and Bidston interconnecting with Merseyrail into Liverpool. The trains run as diesel-Battery electric multiple units.

In 2025, unit 230001 set the world record for the longest train journey on a single battery charge, travelling 200.5 miles (322.7 km). On the 31st of January 2026, the Class 230 entered service with Great Western Railway on the 2.5-mile-long Greenford branch line, running Saturday services only.

=== United States ===
The Edison-Beach battery railcar was developed by Thomas Edison and Ralph H. Beach. The latter headed the Railway Storage Battery Car Company and the Electric Car & Locomotive Corp. Car No. 105 of the Alaska Railroad was an Edison-Beach car, and examples operated on the Central Vermont Railway running between Millers Falls, Northfield and West Townshend. A notable feature of the Edison-Beach cars was the Beach drive system. Each wheel was mounted on ball bearings on a dead axle and was driven by an individual traction motor through gearing.

In August 2023, Caltrain exercised an option order with Stadler, its rolling stock manufacturer, which included a single four-car BEMU trainset. This trainset will serve the line's southernmost stations once electrification of the central and northern stations has been completed. It is hoped that the successful demonstration of BEMU technology on the Caltrain line will provide insight into the feasibility of other potential BEMU implementations in the United States.

In February 2024, Metra announced an order of 16 Stadler FLIRT Akku trainset for use on the Beverly Branch of the Rock Island District. The new rolling stock is hoped to significantly increase frequency on the line, which has closely spaced stations.

== See also ==
- Battery locomotive
- British Rail Class 799, a fuel cell + battery hybrid
- Charging station
- Diesel multiple unit
- Electric multiple unit
- Electric vehicle battery
- Flywheel energy storage
