= ZincFive =

ZincFive, Inc.
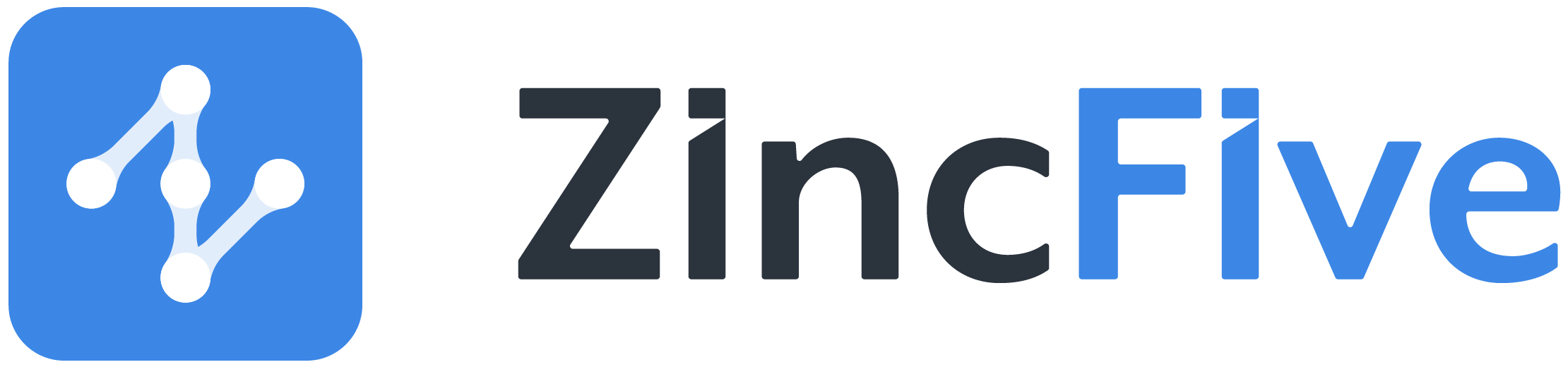
- Industry: Electronics and Energy
- Headquarters: Tualatin, Oregon United States
- Products: Nickel-zinc batteries and power solutions
- Website: zincfive.com

ZincFive, Inc. develops proprietary nickel-zinc battery storage technology to provide electricity for data centers and other applications. The company is based near Portland, Oregon, and sells its products globally.

== History ==
ZincFive was created in 2016 when Ensite Power (formed near Portland in 2015) merged with PowerGenix (formed near San Diego in 2003). The combined entity has raised over $144M from a number of venture capital firms, including Helios Climate Ventures, Standard Investments, Senator Investment Group, and OGCI Climate Investments.

Since 2016 ZincFive has developed products based upon its nickel-zinc battery technology for data centers, transportation control, and industrial engine starting. Products traditionally developed for these markets are based on lead-acid or lithium ion technology; batteries based upon nickel-zinc technology potentially have improved performance with a lower environmental impact.
