= James J. Drumm =

Battery Train innovator

James Joseph Drumm
- Born: 25 January 1896; Dundrum, County Down, Ireland
- Died: 1974 (aged 77–78)
- Known for: Drumm Battery
- Scientific career
- Fields: Chemistry

James Joseph Drumm (25 Jan 1896 – 1974) was an Irish chemist, and inventor of the Drumm battery.

== Life ==
Drumm was born in Dundrum, County Down, in 1896, and initially attended a national school where his mother taught. His secondary education was at St Macartan's College, Monaghan, where he won a county council scholarship.

From 1914 to 1917 he studied at the Chemistry School of University College Dublin (UCD) and then worked in England at the Continuous Reaction Company. In 1922 he returned to Dublin as a chemist for research and production at Fine Chemicals Ltd. He then worked for various companies and participated in research projects. He modernized various processing methods, such as the conservation of peas to keep their natural green colour in tin cans.

According to Casey, from 1926 to 1931, Drumm worked tirelessly on a new accumulator and finally presented the Drumm Traction Battery. In 1931 he was distinguished for his research by the National University of Ireland as Doctor of Natural Sciences.

His most famous research result was an electric storage battery, which was known by his name. Drumm's original idea was to use a hydroquinone electrode in a battery cell for power generation. After some experiments, he devoted his attention to alkaline cells. In Drumm's time the only available rechargeable batteries were based on lead, lead dioxide and sulphuric acid. The iron-nickel alkaline battery was developed by Thomas Edison. Drumm created his first battery at UCD Merrion street and negotiation with the Government led to a prototype conversion of petrol railcar 386 in July 1930. Following successful trials two trains were built at Inchicore and entered regular service on the Dublin–Bray route, with charging stations being built at each end. Two more trains were built in 1939, and the trains continued in service until 1949.

== See also ==
- Irish Chemical News Spring 1988

== Sources ==
- Casey, Michael (29 November 1996). "Famous Irish Chemists: James J. Drumm (1897–1974)". Chemistry in Action. Archived from the original on 22 July 2012.
- Scannell, James (2002). "The Drumm Battery Railcars, 1932-1949". Dublin Historical Record. 55 (2). Old Dublin Society: 181–195. JSTOR 30101349.
