= Drumm Battery Train =

Irish electric trainset

- In service: 1932–1949
- Built at: Inchicore
- Replaced: Steam locomotives and carriages
- Constructed: 1931 and 1938
- Entered service: A and B, 1932; C and D, 1939
- Scrapped: A and B, 1956/7; C and D, 1964
- Number built: 4
- Number scrapped: 4
- Formation: 2–car, articulated
- Fleet numbers: A, B, C, D
- Capacity: 140 passengers/set
- Operators: Great Southern Railways; CIÉ Railways Division
- Lines served: Dublin Amiens Street-Bray; Dublin Harcourt Street-Bray

Specifications
- Maximum speed: 60 miles per hour (97 km/h)
- Weight: 85 long tons (86 t; 95 short tons) per set
- Traction motors: 2
- Power output: 600 hp (450 kW)
- Power supply: 272 Ni-Zn cells, series connected, 460-V. Drumm battery
- Current collection: Pantograph, for battery charging, supplied by DUTC
- Multiple working: Up to 2 units with intermediate unpowered trailer
- Track gauge: 1,600 mm (5 ft 3 in); See Rail gauge in Ireland

The Drumm Battery Train was an Irish battery electric multiple unit developed in the 1930s which ran successfully in service on the Dublin to Bray route. The train's batteries were charged via an overhead pickup at the turnaround station.

The train was a successful implementation of the battery developed by Dr James J. Drumm.

== Background ==
Dr James J. Drumm developed the traction battery in the late 1920s and was supported by the Irish Government as a means of using the excess electricity generated by the Shannon hydroelectric scheme.

== Prototype ==
A prototype was developed by converting petrol railcar 386 to Drumm traction Battery operation.

== Construction ==
Unit A was constructed at Inchicore railway works in 1931 shortly followed by unit B.

Units C and D were constructed in 1938.

== Performance ==
The units had a maximum operating range of 40 miles (64 km) as demonstrated by a test run to Portarlington in 1932. The recharge time was about 1 minute for each mile to be covered, that is about 15 minutes for Dublin to Bray which could be covered in about 20 minutes nonstop. The geared maximum design speed of units C and D were 47 miles per hour (76 km/h) though 60 miles per hour (97 km/h) was touched on an inaugural run and even 72 miles per hour (116 km/h) has been claimed in service.

== Trials ==
Several inaugural runs were held in late 1931 including a trip with President Cosgrave on 2 December 1931.

== Service ==
Units A and B were in service from 1932 to 1949, being joined by units C and D in 1939, though the later units were not as successful as hoped. The Drumm Battery Trains were especially useful in the coal shortages of the early 1940s however were restricted by electricity supply shortages of 1949.

== Withdrawal ==
The units were withdrawn in 1949 due to the batteries becoming life expired and cheaper alternatives available. The batteries and electrical equipment were removed continuing in service as diesel hauled carriages until 1955. They were stored on a siding at Foxrock until being scrapped.

== Incidents ==
At about 22:00 on 25 June 1935 the Drumm Battery "A" train collided about 250 yards (230 m) south of Dún Laoghaire with a collapsed wall resulting from a burst storm sewer during a storm and associated heavy rain. There were two fires in the battery chambers with arcing and considerable heat generated but only charring to the coach body.

== Models ==
A handbuilt model of the Drumm Train is in the Fry Model Railway collection. The model correctly depicts the unit articulated bogie however the front end cab modelling would seem to be proposal for the C and D units but not the actual design used. This is reasonable as Cyril Fry the creator was a draughtsman at Inchicore Works where the units were designed and constructed and would have had access to such drawings.
