= Volcán, Jujuy =

Coordinates: 23°54′S 65°27′W

Volcán (Jujuy)
- Municipality and town
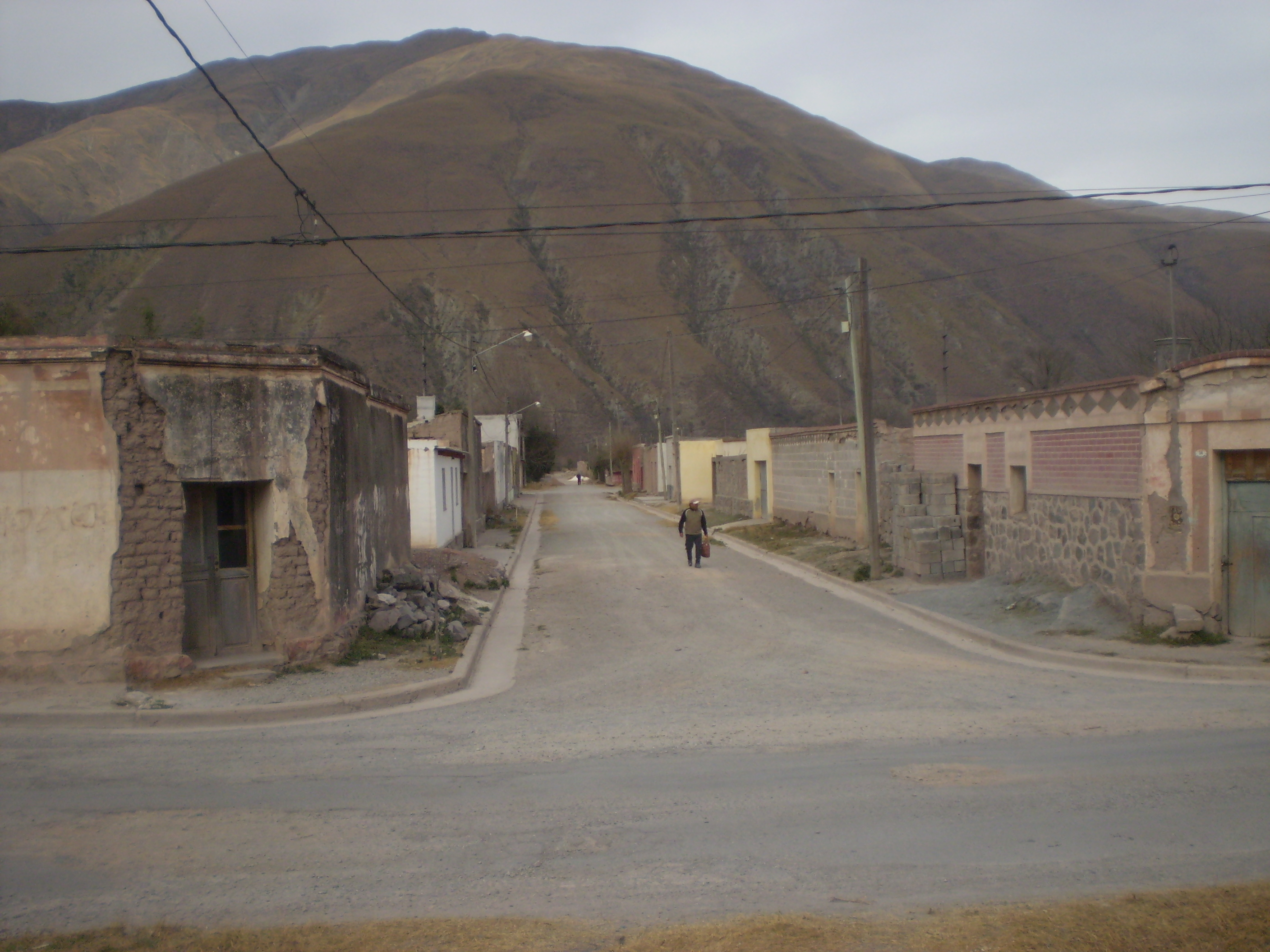
- Visitor center in the town of Volcán (Jujuy), in the old station of the General Belgrano railway that linked the cities of La Quiaca and Tucumán
- Interactive map of Volcán (Jujuy)
- Country: Argentina
- Province: Jujuy Province
- Time zone: UTC−3 (ART)

Volcán (Jujuy) is a town and municipality in Jujuy Province in Argentina.
