= Nickel–zinc battery =

Type of rechargeable battery

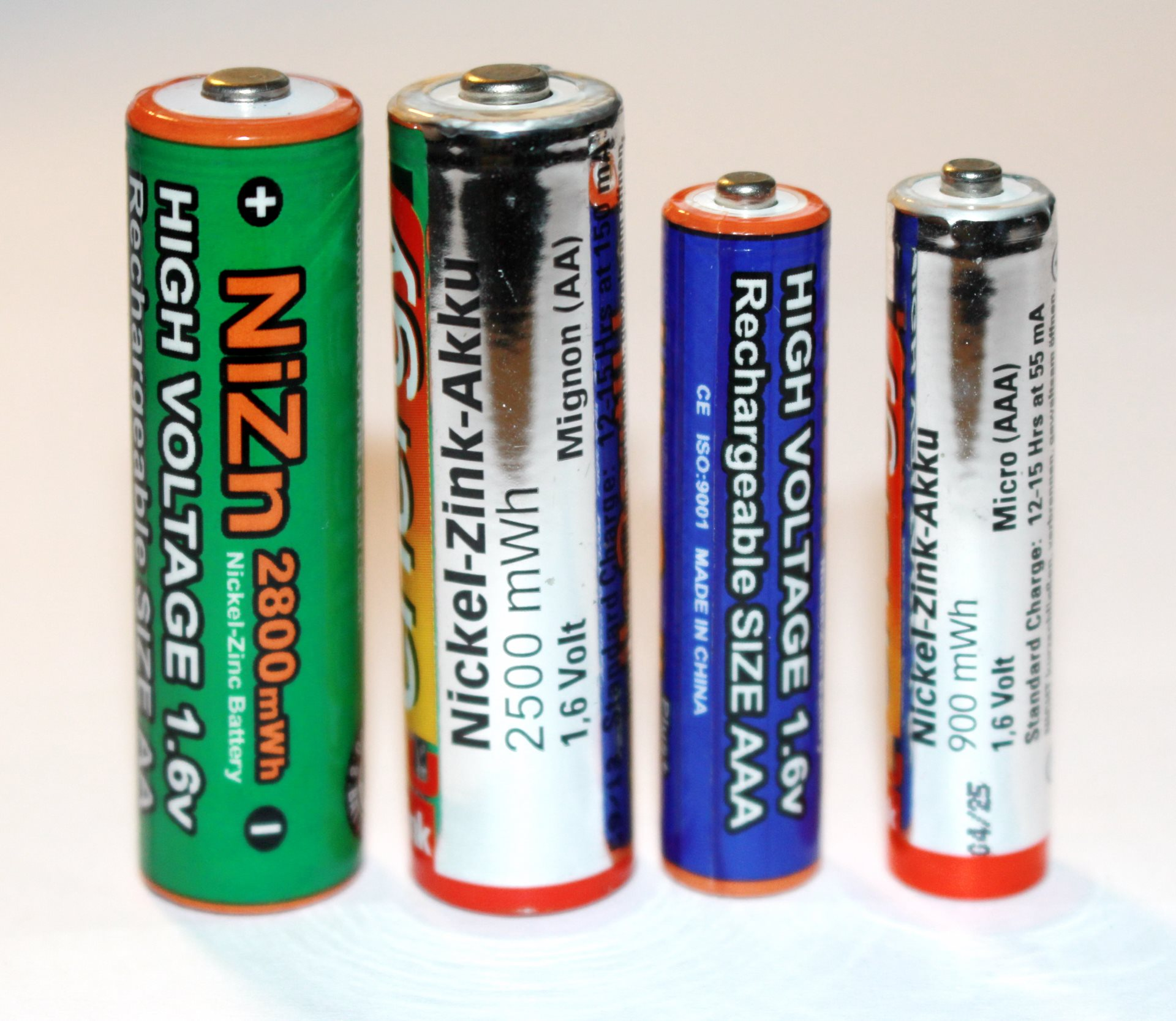
- Nickel–zinc cells in AA and AAA sizes
- Specific energy: 100 W·h/kg
- Energy density: 280 W·h/L
- Specific power: > 3000 W/kg
- Energy/consumer-price: 2–3Wh/US$
- Nominal cell voltage: 1.65 V

A nickel–zinc battery (Ni–Zn battery or NiZn battery) is a type of rechargeable battery similar to nickel–cadmium batteries, but with a higher voltage of 1.6 V.

Larger nickel–zinc battery systems have been known for over 100 years. Since 2000, development of a stabilized zinc electrode system has made this technology viable and competitive with other commercially available rechargeable battery systems. Unlike for some other technologies, trickle charging is not recommended.

== History ==
In 1901 Thomas Alva Edison was awarded U.S. patent 684,204 for a rechargeable nickel–zinc battery system.

The battery was later developed by the Irish chemist Dr. James J. Drumm (1897–1974), and installed in four two-car Drumm railcar sets between 1932 and 1949 for use on the Dublin–Bray railway line. Although successful, they were withdrawn when the batteries wore out. Early nickel–zinc batteries provided only a small number of discharge–recharge cycles. In the 1960s nickel–zinc batteries were investigated as an alternative to silver–zinc batteries for military applications, and in the 1970s were again of interest for electric vehicles. Evercel Inc. developed and patented several improvements in nickel–zinc batteries, but withdrew from that area in 2004.

== Applications ==
Nickel–zinc batteries have a charge–discharge curve similar to 1.2 V NiCd or NiMH cells, but with a higher 1.6 V nominal voltage.

Nickel–zinc batteries perform well in high-drain applications, and may have the potential to replace lead–acid batteries because of their higher energy-to-mass ratio and higher power-to-mass ratio – as little as 25% of the mass for the same power. Nickel–zinc batteries are less expensive than nickel–cadmium batteries and are expected to be priced somewhere between nickel–cadmium and lead–acid types. Nickel–zinc may be used as a substitute for nickel–cadmium. The European Parliament has supported bans on cadmium-based batteries; nickel–zinc is a good alternative for power tools and other applications. A disadvantage is increased self-discharge rate after about 30–50 cycles, so that batteries do not hold their charge as long as when new. Where this is not a problem nickel–zinc is a good choice for applications requiring high power and high voltage.

== Battery life ==
Compared with cadmium hydroxide, the tendency of the soluble zinc hydroxide ion (zincate) to dissolve into solution and not fully migrate back to the cathode during recharging has, in the past, presented challenges for the commercial viability of the nickel–zinc battery. Another common issue with zinc rechargeable batteries is electrode shape change and dendrites (or "whiskers"), which may reduce the cell discharging performance or, eventually, short out the cell, resulting in a low cycle life.

Recent advances have enabled this problem to be greatly reduced. These advances include improvements in electrode separator materials, inclusion of zinc material stabilizers, and electrolyte improvements (e.g. by using phosphates). PowerGenix has developed 1.6 V batteries with claimed battery cycle life comparable to NiCd batteries.

Battery cycle life is most commonly specified at a discharge depth of 80 percent of rated capacity and assuming a one-hour discharge current rate. As the discharge current or the depth of discharge is reduced, the number of charge-discharge cycles for a battery increases. When comparing Ni–Zn to other battery technologies, cycle life comparisons may vary depending on the discharge rate and depth of discharge used.

== Advantages ==
Nickel–zinc cells have an open circuit voltage of 1.85 volts when fully charged, and a nominal voltage of 1.65 V. This makes Ni–Zn particularly suitable for electronic products that require the 1.5 V of alkaline primary cells rather than the 1.2 V of most rechargeable cells (most circuits tolerate the slightly higher voltage), and will not function correctly beyond, typically, the endpoint voltage of an alkaline cell. The output voltage of a 1.2 V rechargeable cell will drop to this point before it has fully delivered its charge.

For use in multi-cell batteries, the higher voltage of Ni–Zn cells requires fewer cells than NiCd and NiMH for the same voltage. They have low internal impedance (typically 5 milliohms), which allows for high battery discharge rates, up to 50C. (C is battery capacity in Ah, divided by one hour.)

Newer cells which are more powerful and have a life of up to 800 cycles can be an alternative to Li-ion batteries for electric vehicles.

Nickel–zinc batteries do not use mercury, lead, or cadmium, or metal hydrides, all of which can be difficult to recycle. Both nickel and zinc are commonly occurring elements in nature, and can be fully recycled. NiZn cells use no flammable active materials or organic electrolytes, and later designs use polymeric separators which reduce the dendrites problem.

Properly designed NiZn cells can have very high power density and good low-temperature discharging performance, and can be discharged to almost 100% and recharged without problems. As of 2017 they were available in sizes up to F, and 50Ah/prismatic cell.

Zinc is a cheap and abundant metal, the 24th most abundant element in the Earth's crust, and is not dangerous to health. Common oxidation is +2, so charge and discharge move two electrons instead of one as in NiMH batteries.

== Charging ==
Chargers for nickel–zinc batteries must be capable of charging a battery with a fully charged voltage of 1.85 V per cell, higher than the 1.4 V of NiMH. NiZn technology is well suited for fast recharge cycling, as optimum charge rates of C or C/2 are preferred.

Known charging regimes include a constant current of C or C/2 to cell voltage = 1.9 V. One manufacturer recommends charging at a constant current of C/4 to C until cell voltage reaches 1.9V, then continuing to charge at a constant voltage of 1.9V until charge current declines to C/40.

Maximum charge time was stated in 2009 to be about three hours. Once charged, continuous trickle charging is not recommended, as recombination is not provided for, and excess hydrogen will eventually vent, adversely affecting battery cycle life. Some chargers for NiZn batteries state that they do not trickle charge after the battery is fully charged, but shut off.

== Chemistry ==
(−) electrode: Zn + 4 OH^{−} ⇌ Zn(OH)_{4}^{2−} + 2e^{−} (E^{0} = −1.2 V/SHE )

Electrolyte: KOH

Zn(OH)_{4}^{2−} ⇌ Zn(OH)_{2} + 2OH^{−}
Zn(OH)_{2} ⇌ ZnO + H_{2}O

(+) electrode: 2 NiO(OH) + 2 H_{2}O + 2 e^{−} ⇌ 2 Ni(OH)_{2} + 2 OH^{−} (E^{0} = +0.50 V/SHE)

Overall reaction: Zn + 2 NiO(OH) + H_{2}O ⇌ ZnO + 2 Ni(OH)_{2}

Parasitic reaction: Zn + 2 H_{2}O → Zn(OH)_{2} + H_{2}

== See also ==
- Comparison of battery types
- List of battery sizes
- List of battery types
- Nickel–cadmium battery
- Zinc–air battery
