= Utsunomiya Line (disambiguation) =

Utsunomiya Line (宇都宮線, Utsunomiya-sen) can refer to a selection of Japanese railway lines:

- Utsunomiya Line, a commuter rail line operated by JR East
- Tōbu Utsunomiya Line, a commuter rail line operated by private operator Tobu Railway

== See also ==
- Utsunomiya Light Rail, a light rail transit line operated by third-sector company Utsunomiya Light Rail Co., Ltd.
