= Tobiyama Castle Site Station =

Light rail station in Utsunomiya, Japan

Tobiyama Castle Site Station 飛山城跡停留場
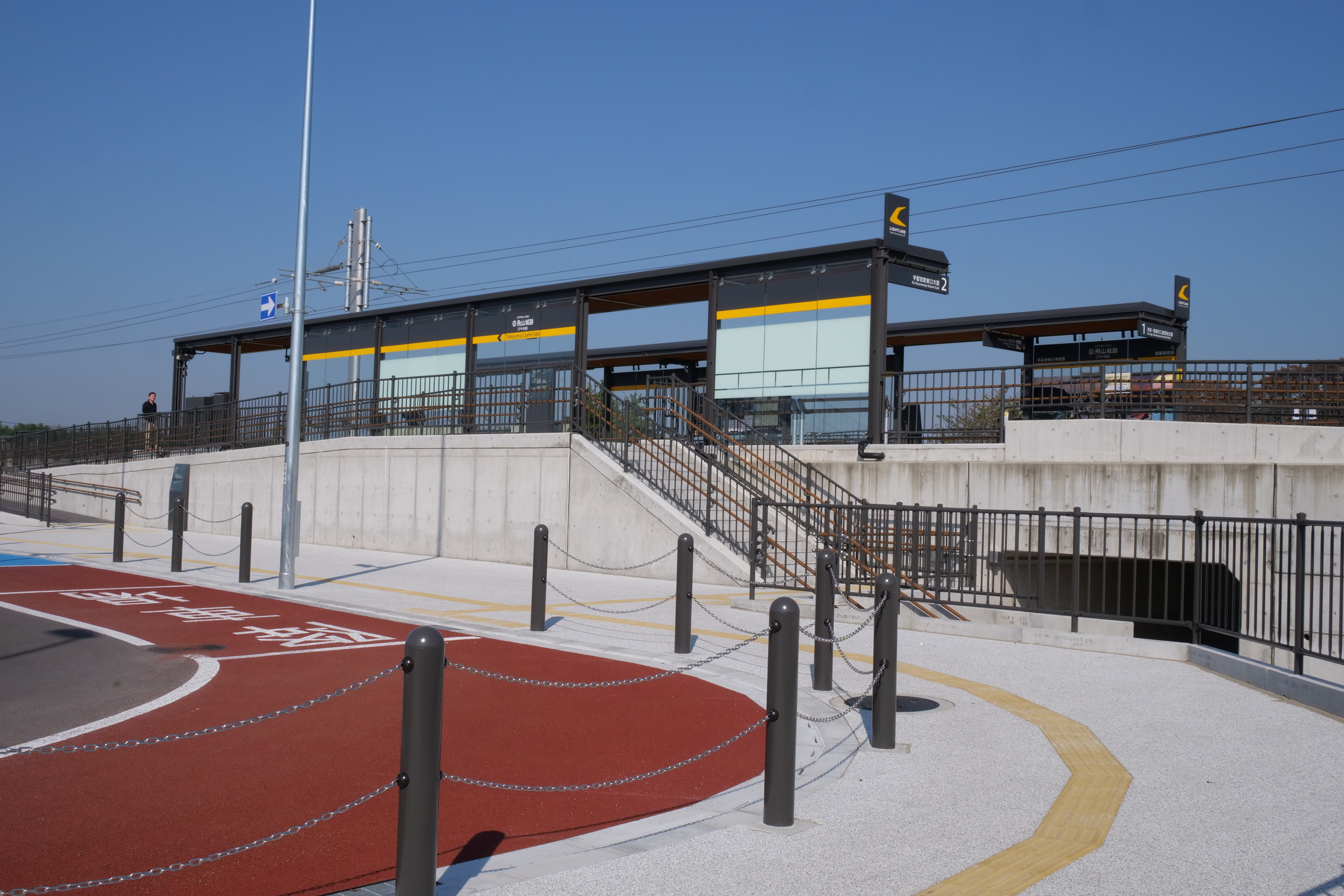
- View of the station in November 2023

General information
- Location: Takeshita-chō, Utsunomiya, Tochigi; Japan
- Coordinates: 36°32′54.16″N 139°57′48.44″E
- System: light rail station
- Owner: Utsunomiya City and Haga Town
- Manager: Utsunomiya Light Rail
- Line: Utsunomiya Haga Light Rail Line
- Distance: 6.1 km
- Platforms: 2
- Tracks: 2
- Tram routes: 1
- Tram operators: Utsunomiya Light Rail

Construction
- Structure type: elevated

Other information
- Status: Unstaffed
- Station code: 09

History
- Opened: 26 August 2023

Passengers
- FY2024: 386 (daily) ▲9.35%

Services
| Preceding station | Utsunomiya Light Rail | Following station |
|---|---|---|
| Hiraishi-chuo Elementary School towards Utsunomiya Station East | Utsunomiya Haga Light Rail Line Local | Seiryo High School towards Haga Takanezawa Industrial Park |
Location

Tobiyama Castle Site Station (飛山城跡停留場, Tobiyamajō ato Teiryūjō) is a station serving the Utsunomiya Light Rail, located in Utsunomiya. The station number is 09. It is named for Tobiyama Castle, a historic site located just north of the station.

== History ==
In the light rail's planning phase, the placeholder name for the station was Shimo-Takeshita. The station name was changed to the current name on April 23, 2021. On August 26, 2023, the station opened with the Utsunomiya Light Rail.

== Station layout ==
The station is elevated, with two tracks and platforms.

=== Platforms ===
1

Utsunomiya LRT
for Haga Takanezawa Industrial Park
2
for Utsunomiya
