= Mine Station (Tochigi) =

Light rail station in Utsunomiya, Japan

Mine Station 峰停留場
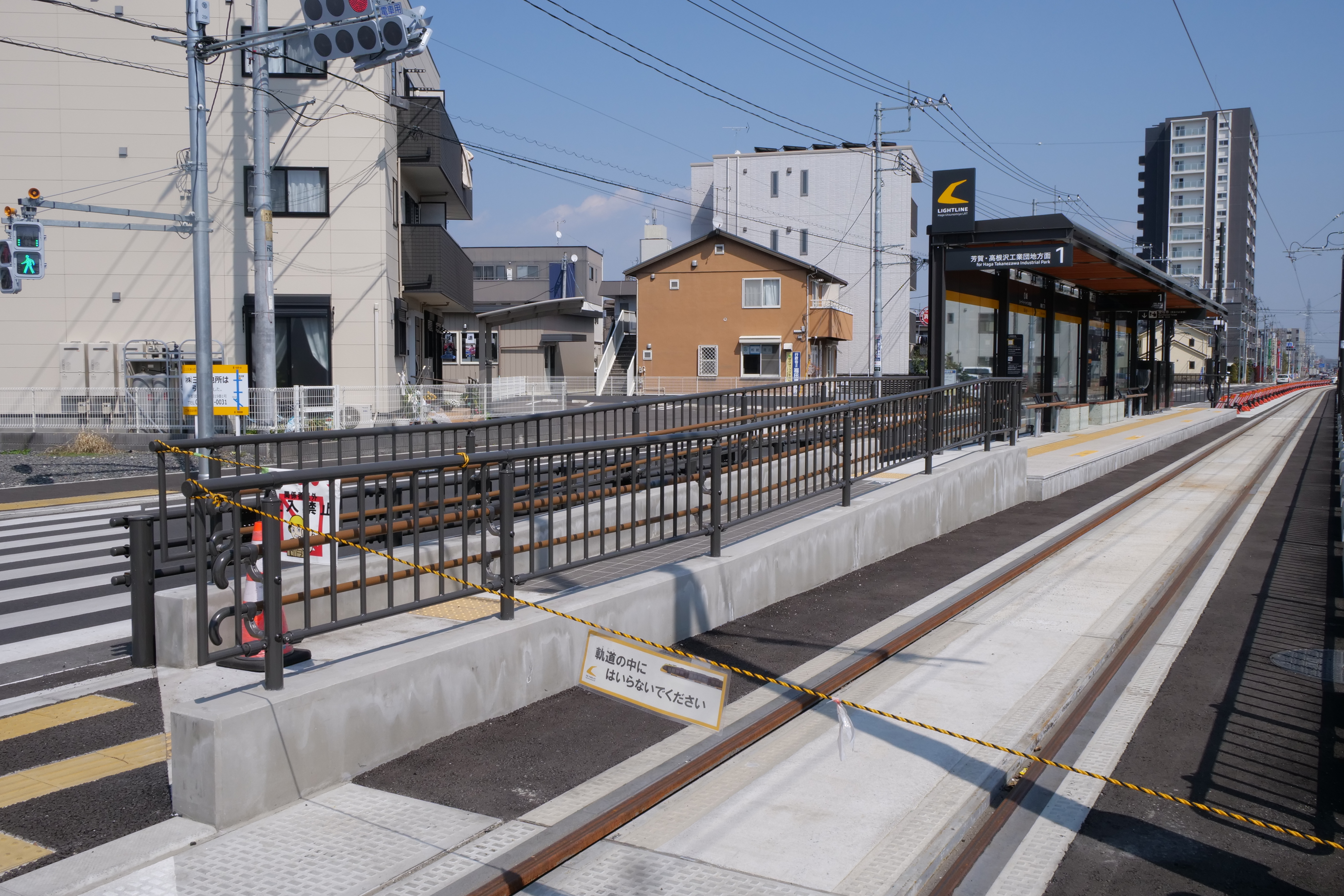
- View of the station in April 2023

General information
- Other names: CDP main office mae
- Location: Mine, Utsunomiya, Tochigi; Japan
- Coordinates: 36°33′27.0″N 139°54′54.8″E
- System: light rail station
- Owner: Utsunomiya City and Haga Town
- Manager: Utsunomiya Light Rail
- Line: Utsunomiya Haga Light Rail Line
- Distance: 1.5 km from Utsunomiya Station East
- Platforms: 2
- Tracks: 2
- Tram routes: 1
- Tram operators: Utsunomiya Light Rail

Construction
- Structure type: At-grade

Other information
- Status: Unstaffed
- Station code: 04

History
- Opened: 26 August 2023

Passengers
- FY2024: 1,004 (daily) ▲39.25%

Services
Preceding station	Utsunomiya Light Rail	Following station
Ekihigashi Park towards Utsunomiya Station East	Utsunomiya Haga Light Rail Line Local	Yoto 3-chome towards Haga Takanezawa Industrial Park
Location

Mine Station (峰停留場, Mine Teiryūjō) is a station serving the Utsunomiya Light Rail, located in Utsunomiya. The station number is 04.

CDP has purchased the right to choose the secondary name for the station, and the station has the secondary name CDP main office mae (シーデーピージャパン本社前, Shīdēpī Japan honsha mae).

== History ==
In the light rail's planning phase, the placeholder name for the station was Imaizumicho. The station name was changed to the current name on April 23, 2021. On August 26, 2023, the station opened with the Utsunomiya Light Rail.

CDP has purchased the right to choose the secondary name for the station, and the station has the secondary name CDP main office mae (シーデーピージャパン本社前, Shīdēpī Japan honsha mae).

== Station layout ==
The station is built at-grade, with two tracks and platforms.

=== Platforms ===
1

Utsunomiya Light Rail
for Haga Takanezawa Industrial Park
2
for Utsunomiya
