= Yoto 3-chome Station =

Light rail station in Utsunomiya, Japan

Yoto 3-chome Station 陽東3丁目停留場
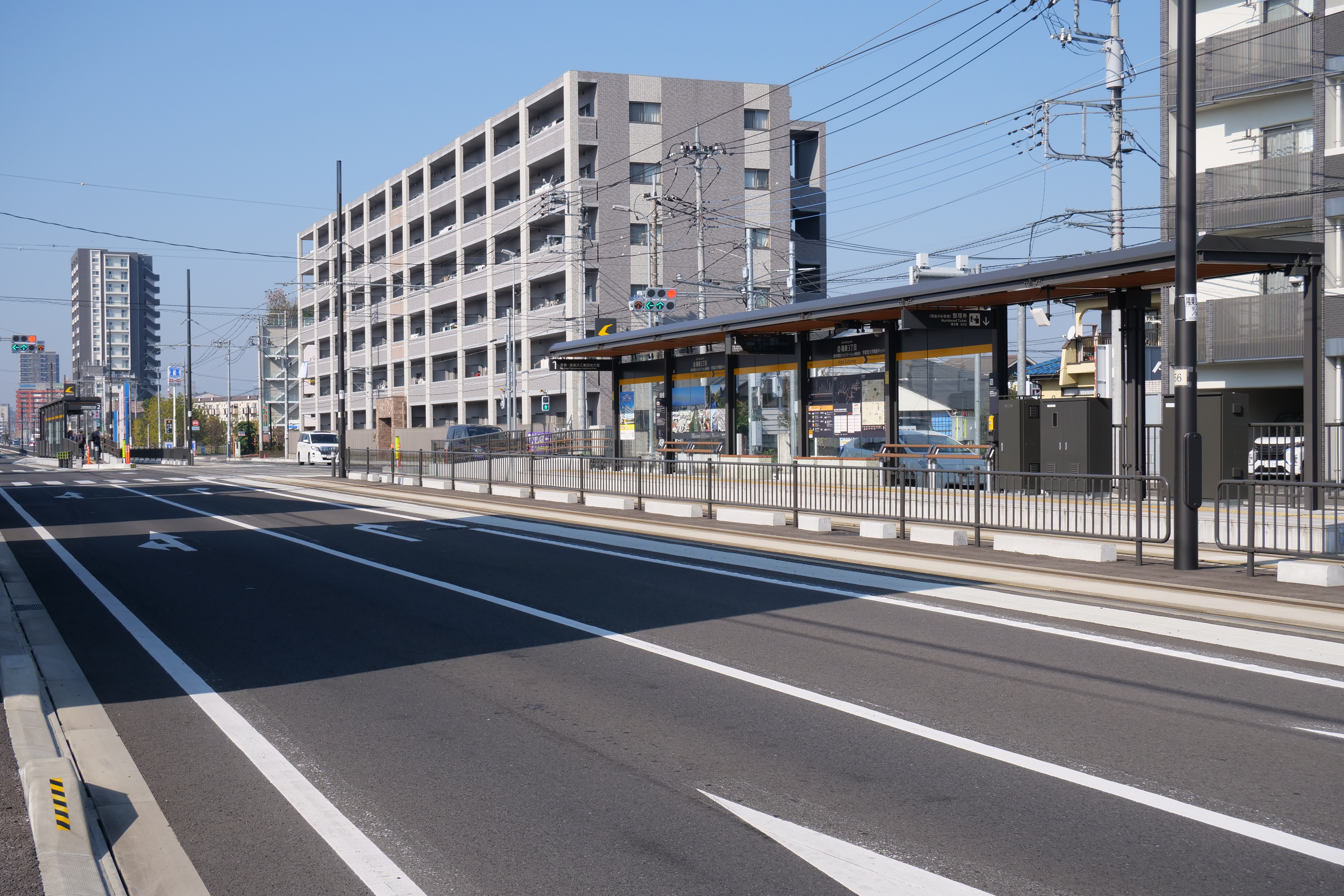
- View of the station in November 2023

General information
- Other names: Shin-Utsunomiya Rehabilitation Hospital mae
- Location: Yōtō-3, Utsunomiya, Tochigi; Japan
- Coordinates: 36°33′26.3″N 139°55′23.5″E
- System: light rail station
- Owner: Utsunomiya City and Haga Town
- Manager: Utsunomiya Light Rail
- Line: Utsunomiya Haga Light Rail Line
- Distance: 2.1 km from Utsunomiya Station East
- Platforms: 2
- Tracks: 2
- Tram routes: 1
- Tram operators: Utsunomiya Light Rail

Construction
- Structure type: At-grade

Other information
- Status: Unstaffed
- Station code: 05

History
- Opened: 26 August 2023

Passengers
- FY2024: 900 (daily) ▲29.12%

Services
Preceding station	Utsunomiya Light Rail	Following station
Mine towards Utsunomiya Station East	Utsunomiya Haga Light Rail Line Local	Utsunomiya University Yoto Campus towards Haga Takanezawa Industrial Park
Location

Yoto 3-chome Station (陽東3丁目停留場, Yōtō san-chōme Teiryūjō) is a station serving the Utsunomiya Light Rail, located in Utsunomiya. The station number is 05.

The operator of Shin-Utsunomiya Rehabilitation Hospital has purchased the right to choose the secondary name for the station, and the station has the secondary name Shin-Utsunomiya Rehabilitation Hospital mae (新宇都宮リハビリテーション病院前, Shin-Utsunomiya rihabirite-shon byōin mae).

== History ==
In the light rail's planning phase, the placeholder name for the station was Yoto. The station name was changed to the current name on April 23, 2021. On August 26, 2023, the station opened with the Utsunomiya Light Rail.

== Station layout ==
The station is built at-grade, with two tracks and platforms.

=== Platforms ===
1

Utsunomiya LRT
for Haga Takanezawa Industrial Park
2
for Utsunomiya
