= Hiraishi Station =

Hiraishi Station may refer to:

- Hiraishi Station (Akita)
- Hiraishi Station (Tochigi)
