= Higashi-Shukugo Station =

Light rail station in Utsunomiya, Japan

Higashi-Shukugo Station 東宿郷停留場
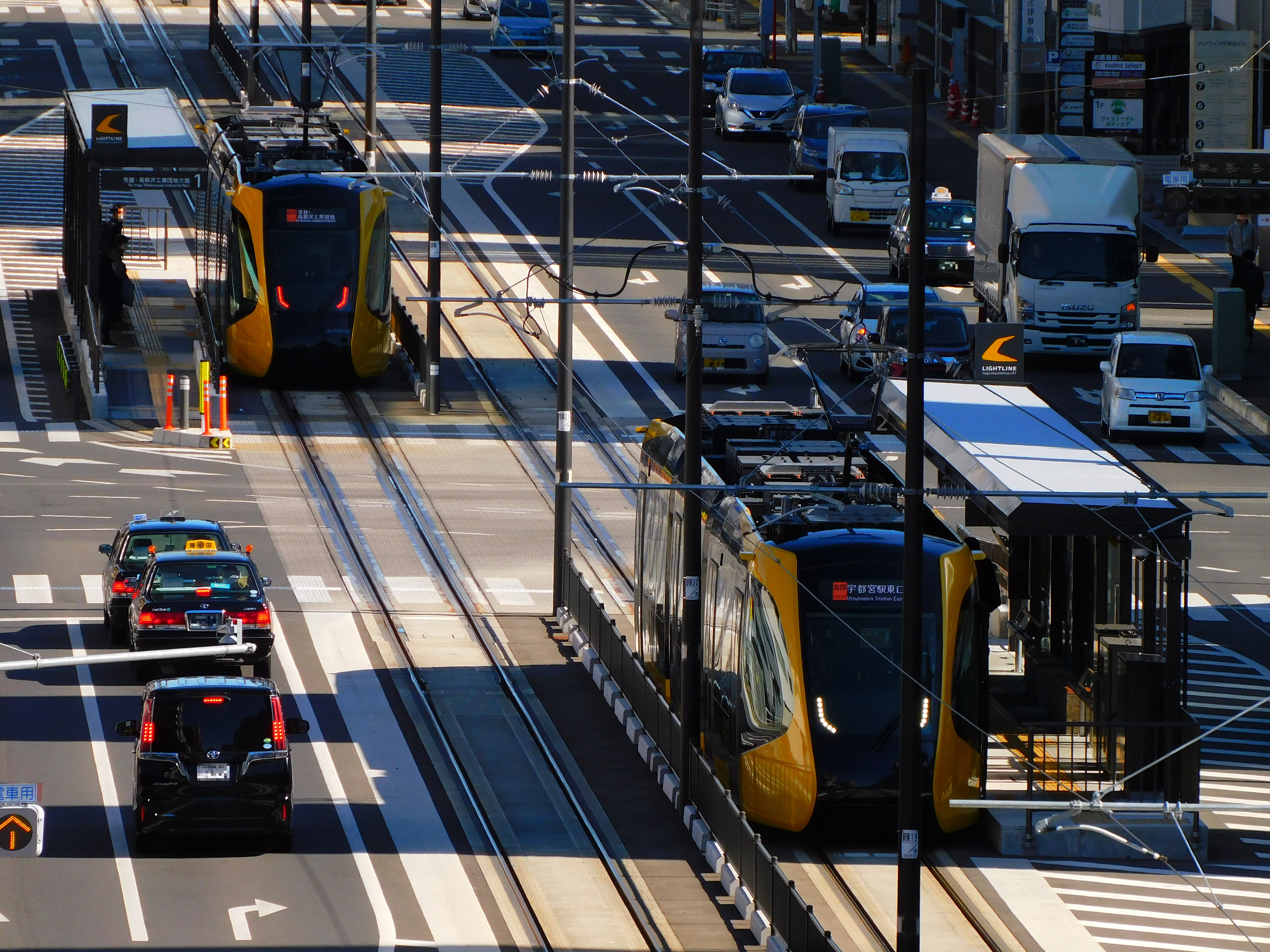
- View of the station from the Light Cube in February 2024

General information
- Location: Higashishukugo, Utsunomiya, Tochigi 321-0969; Japan
- Coordinates: 36.5583°N 139.9030°E
- System: light rail station
- Owner: Utsunomiya City and Haga Town
- Manager: Utsunomiya Light Rail
- Line: Utsunomiya Haga Light Rail Line
- Distance: 0.4 km from Utsunomiya Station East
- Platforms: 2
- Tracks: 2
- Tram routes: 1
- Tram operators: Utsunomiya Light Rail

Construction
- Structure type: At-grade

Other information
- Status: Unstaffed
- Station code: 02

History
- Opened: 26 August 2023

Passengers
- FY2024: 750 (daily) ▲18.3%

Services
Preceding station	Utsunomiya Light Rail	Following station
Utsunomiya towards Utsunomiya Station East	Utsunomiya Haga Light Rail Line Local	Ekihigashi Park towards Haga Takanezawa Industrial Park
Location

Higashi-Shukugo Station (東宿郷停留場, Higashi-Shukugō Teiryūjō) is a station serving the Utsunomiya Light Rail, located in Utsunomiya. The station number is 02.

== History ==
In the light rail's planning phase, the placeholder name for the station was Shukugochō. The station name was changed to the current one on April 23, 2021. On August 26, 2023, the station opened with the Utsunomiya Light Rail.

== Station layout ==
The station is built at-grade, with two tracks and platforms. The station was constructed by Masken.

=== Platforms ===
1

Utsunomiya Light Rail
for Haga Takanezawa Industrial Park
2
for Utsunomiya
