= Hiraishi-chuo Elementary School Station =

Light rail station in Utsunomiya, Japan

Hiraishi-chuo Elementary School Station 平石中央小学校前停留場
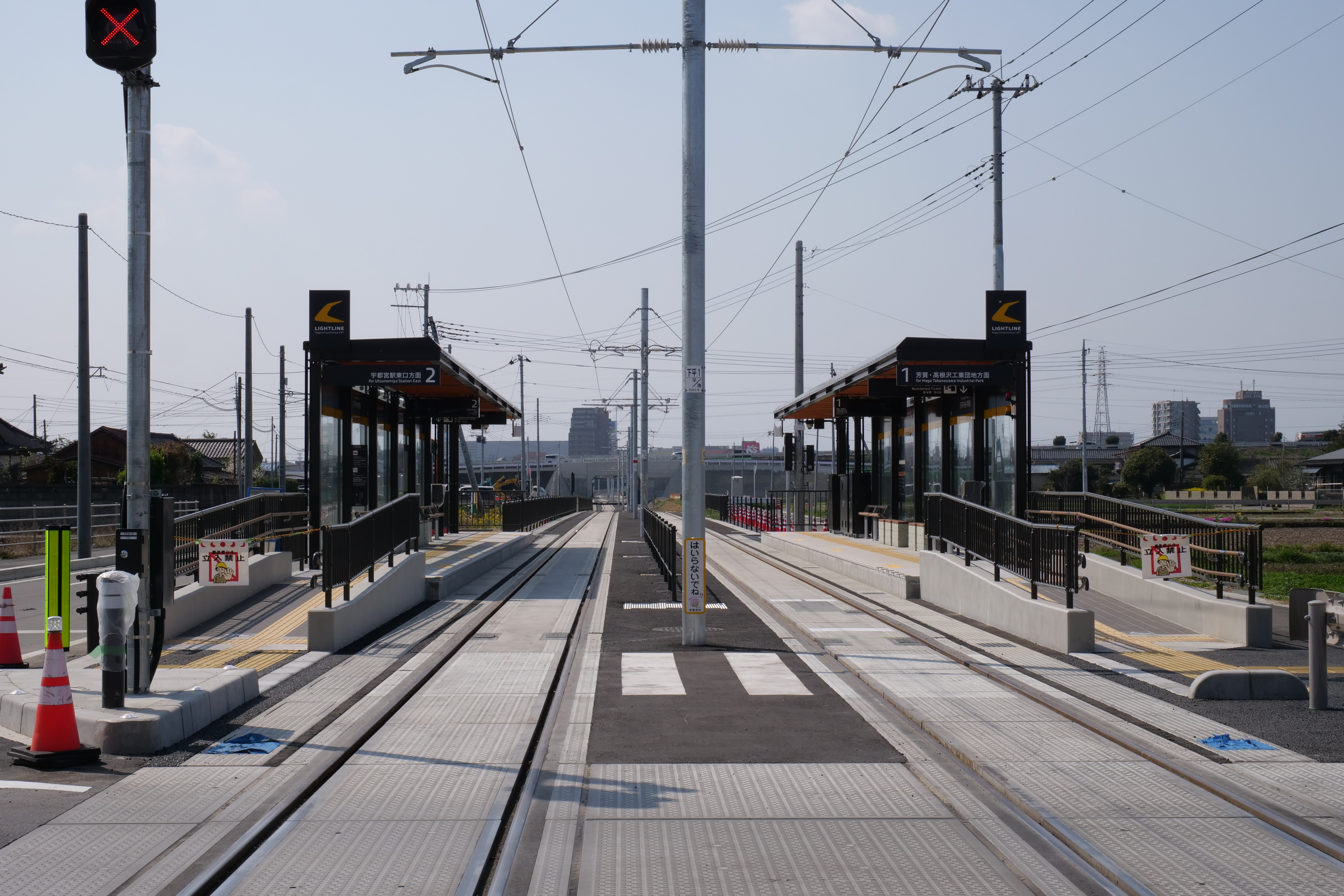
- View of the station in April 2023

General information
- Location: Shimo-Hiraide, Utsunomiya, Tochigi; Japan
- Coordinates: 36°33′17.38″N 139°56′42.14″E
- System: light rail station
- Owner: Utsunomiya City and Haga Town
- Manager: Utsunomiya Light Rail
- Line: Utsunomiya Haga Light Rail Line
- Distance: 4.2 km
- Platforms: 2
- Tracks: 2
- Tram routes: 1
- Tram operators: Utsunomiya Light Rail

Construction
- Structure type: at-grade

Other information
- Status: Unstaffed
- Station code: 08

History
- Opened: 26 August 2023

Passengers
- FY2024: 121 (daily) 0%

Services
| Preceding station | Utsunomiya Light Rail | Following station |
|---|---|---|
| Hiraishi towards Utsunomiya Station East | Utsunomiya Haga Light Rail Line Local | Tobiyama Castle Site towards Haga Takanezawa Industrial Park |
Location

Hiraishi-chuo Elementary School Station (平石中央小学校前停留場, Hiraishi-chūō shōgakkō mae Teiryūjō) is a station serving the Utsunomiya Light Rail, located in Utsunomiya. The station number is 08.

== History ==
In the light rail's planning phase, the placeholder name for the station was Shimo-Hiraide. The station name was changed to the current name on April 23, 2021. On August 26, 2023, the station opened with the Utsunomiya Light Rail.

== Station layout ==
The station is built at-grade, with two tracks and platforms.

=== Platforms ===
1

Utsunomiya LRT
for Haga Takanezawa Industrial Park
2
for Utsunomiya
