= Ekihigashi Park Station =

Light rail station in Utsunomiya, Japan

Ekihigashi Park Station 駅東公園前停留場
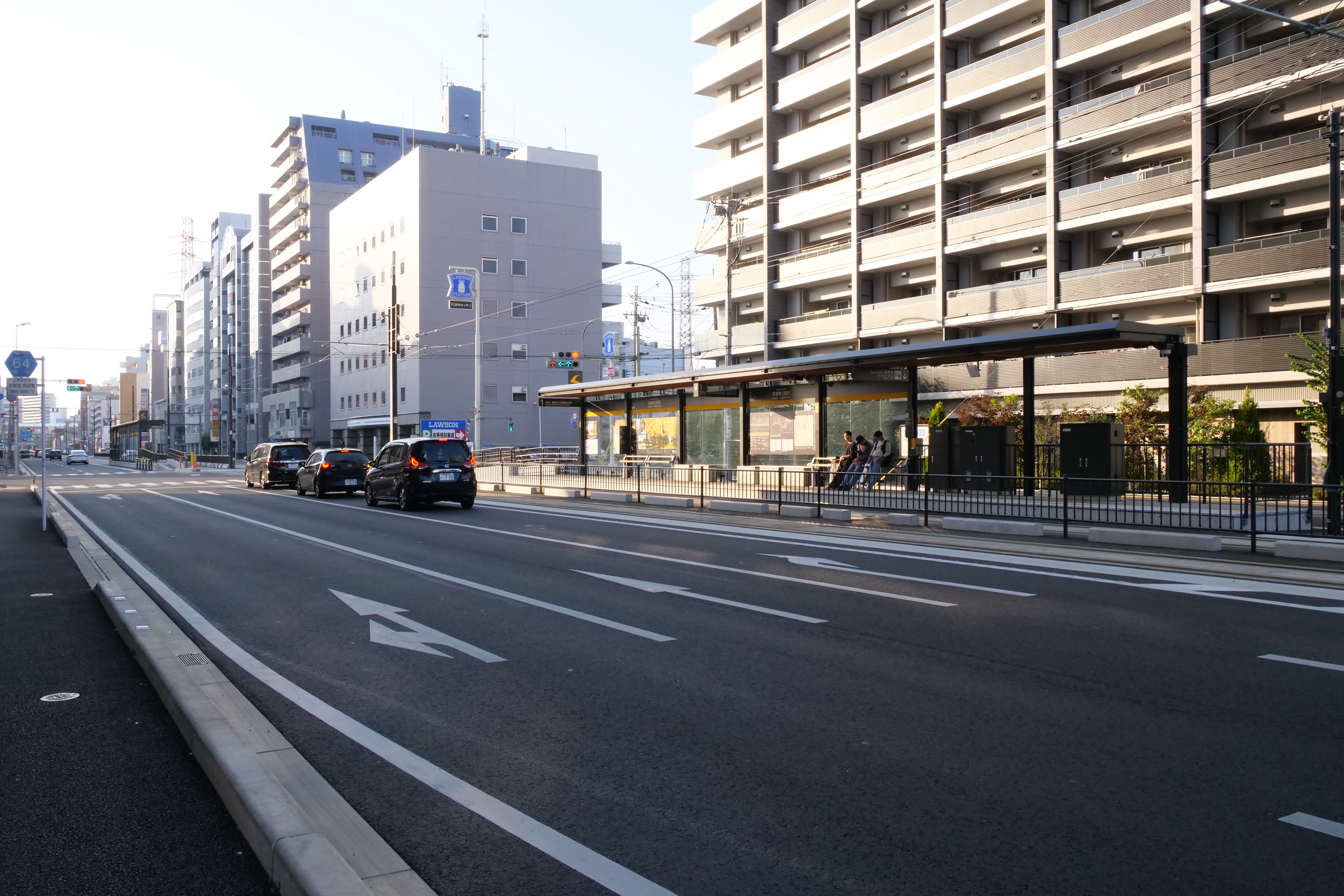
- View of the station in November 2023

General information
- Other names: Tochigi Bank Utsunomiya-Higashi office mae
- Location: Higashishukugo, Utsunomiya, Tochigi; Japan
- Coordinates: 36.5580°N 139.9081°E
- System: light rail station
- Owner: Utsunomiya City and Haga Town
- Manager: Utsunomiya Light Rail
- Line: Utsunomiya Haga Light Rail Line
- Distance: 0.8 km from Utsunomiya Station East
- Platforms: 2
- Tracks: 2
- Tram routes: 1
- Tram operators: Utsunomiya Light Rail

Construction
- Structure type: At-grade

Other information
- Status: Unstaffed
- Station code: 03

History
- Opened: 26 August 2023

Passengers
- FY2024: 1,352 (daily) ▲20.5%

Services
| Preceding station | Utsunomiya Light Rail | Following station |
|---|---|---|
| Higashi-Shukugo towards Utsunomiya Station East | Utsunomiya Haga Light Rail Line Local | Mine towards Haga Takanezawa Industrial Park |
Location

Ekihigashi Park Station (駅東公園前停留場, Eki-Higashi kōen mae Teiryūjō) is a station serving the Utsunomiya Light Rail, located in Utsunomiya. The station number is 03.

Tochigi bank has purchased the right to choose the secondary name for the station, and the station has the secondary name Tochigi Bank Utsunomiya-Higashi branch mae (栃木銀行 宇都宮東支店前, Tochigi Ginkō Utsunomiya-Higashi Shiten mae).

== History ==
In the light rail's planning phase, the placeholder name for the station was Higashi-Shukugo, which is now used in the tram stop 0.4km closer to Utsunomiya station. The current name comes from the park nearby the station. On August 26, 2023, the station opened with the Utsunomiya Light Rail.

Tochigi bank has purchased the right to choose the secondary name for the station, and the station has the secondary name Tochigi Bank Utsunomiya-Higashi branch mae (栃木銀行 宇都宮東支店前, Tochigi Ginkō Utsunomiya-Higashi Shiten mae).

== Station layout ==
The station is built at-grade, with two tracks and platforms.

=== Platforms ===
1

Utsunomiya Light Rail
for Haga Takanezawa Industrial Park
2
for Utsunomiya
