= Hiraishi Station (Tochigi) =

Light rail station in Utsunomiya, Japan

Hiraishi Station 平石停留場
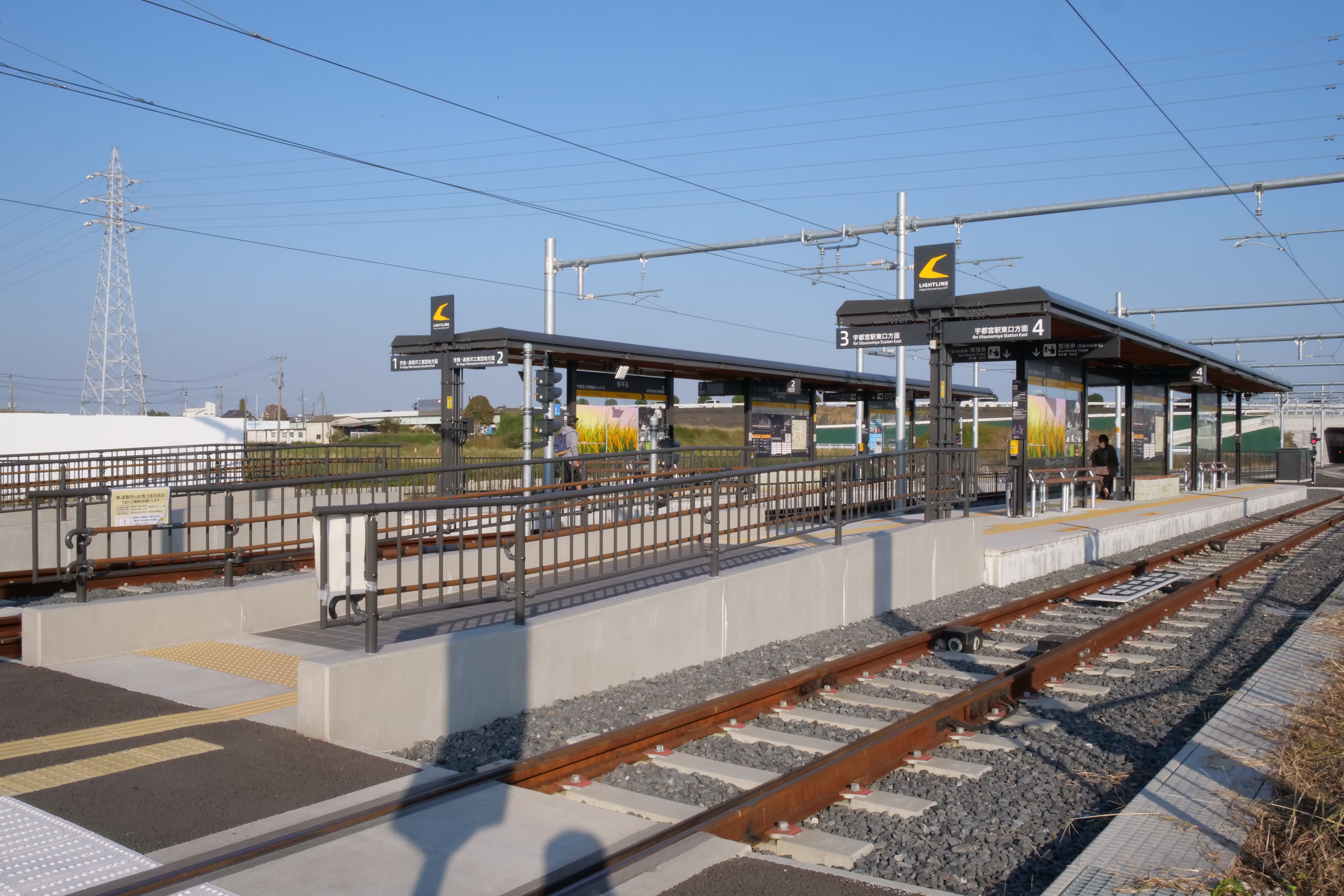
- View of the station in November 2023

General information
- Location: Shimo-Hiraide, Utsunomiya, Tochigi; Japan
- Coordinates: 36°33′28.7″N 139°56′21.0″E
- System: light rail station
- Owner: Utsunomiya City and Haga Town
- Manager: Utsunomiya Light Rail
- Line: Utsunomiya Haga Light Rail Line
- Distance: 3.7 km
- Platforms: 2
- Tracks: 4
- Tram routes: 1
- Tram operators: Utsunomiya Light Rail
- Connections: Park & Ride

Construction
- Structure type: at-grade

Other information
- Status: Unstaffed
- Station code: 07

History
- Opened: 26 August 2023

Passengers
- FY2024: 503 (daily) ▲14.58%

Services
Preceding station	Utsunomiya Light Rail	Following station
Utsunomiya University Yoto Campus One-way operation	Utsunomiya Haga Light Rail Line Rapid	Seiryo High School towards Haga Takanezawa Industrial Park
Utsunomiya University Yoto Campus towards Utsunomiya Station East	Utsunomiya Haga Light Rail Line Local	Hiraishi-chuo Elementary School towards Haga Takanezawa Industrial Park
Location

Hiraishi Station (平石停留場, Hiraishi Teiryūjō) is a station serving the Utsunomiya Light Rail, located in Utsunomiya. The station number is 07.

== History ==
In the light rail's planning phase, the placeholder name for the station was Hiradechō. The station name was changed to the current name on April 23, 2021. On August 26, 2023, the station opened with the Utsunomiya Light Rail.

== Station layout ==
The station is built at-grade, with four tracks and platforms.

=== Platforms ===
1,2

Utsunomiya LRT
for Haga Takanezawa Industrial Park
3,4
for Utsunomiya
