= Utsunomiya Light Rail =

Light rail line in Utsunomiya, Japan

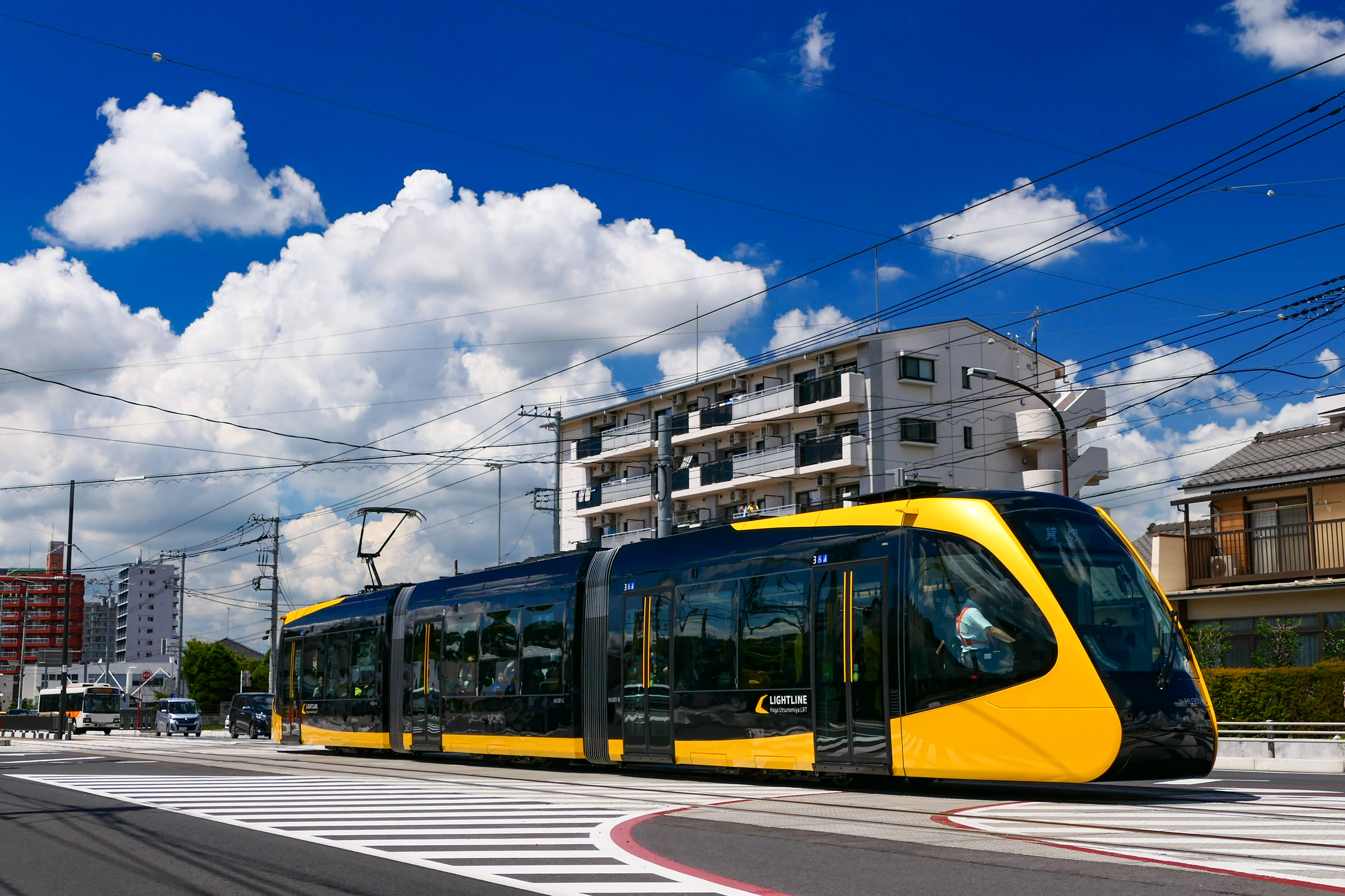
- Utsunomiya Light Rail HU300 series "Lightline"

Overview
- Other name: Haga Utsunomiya LRT
- Native name: 宇都宮ライトレール
- Status: Operational
- Owner: Utsunomiya City and Haga Town
- Locale: Utsunomiya and Haga, Tochigi Prefecture, Japan
- Termini: Utsunomiya Station East; Haga Takanezawa Industrial Park
- Stations: 19
- Website: www.miyarail.co.jp

Service
- Type: Light rail
- Operator(s): Utsunomiya Light Rail Co., Ltd.
- Rolling stock: HU300 series

History
- Opened: 26 August 2023; 3 years ago

Technical
- Line length: 14.6 km (9.1 mi)
- Num of tracks: 2
- Track gauge: 1,067 mm (3 ft 6 in)
- Electrification: Overhead line, 750 V DC
- Operating speed: 40 km/h (25 mph)

Utsunomiya Light Rail Co., Ltd.
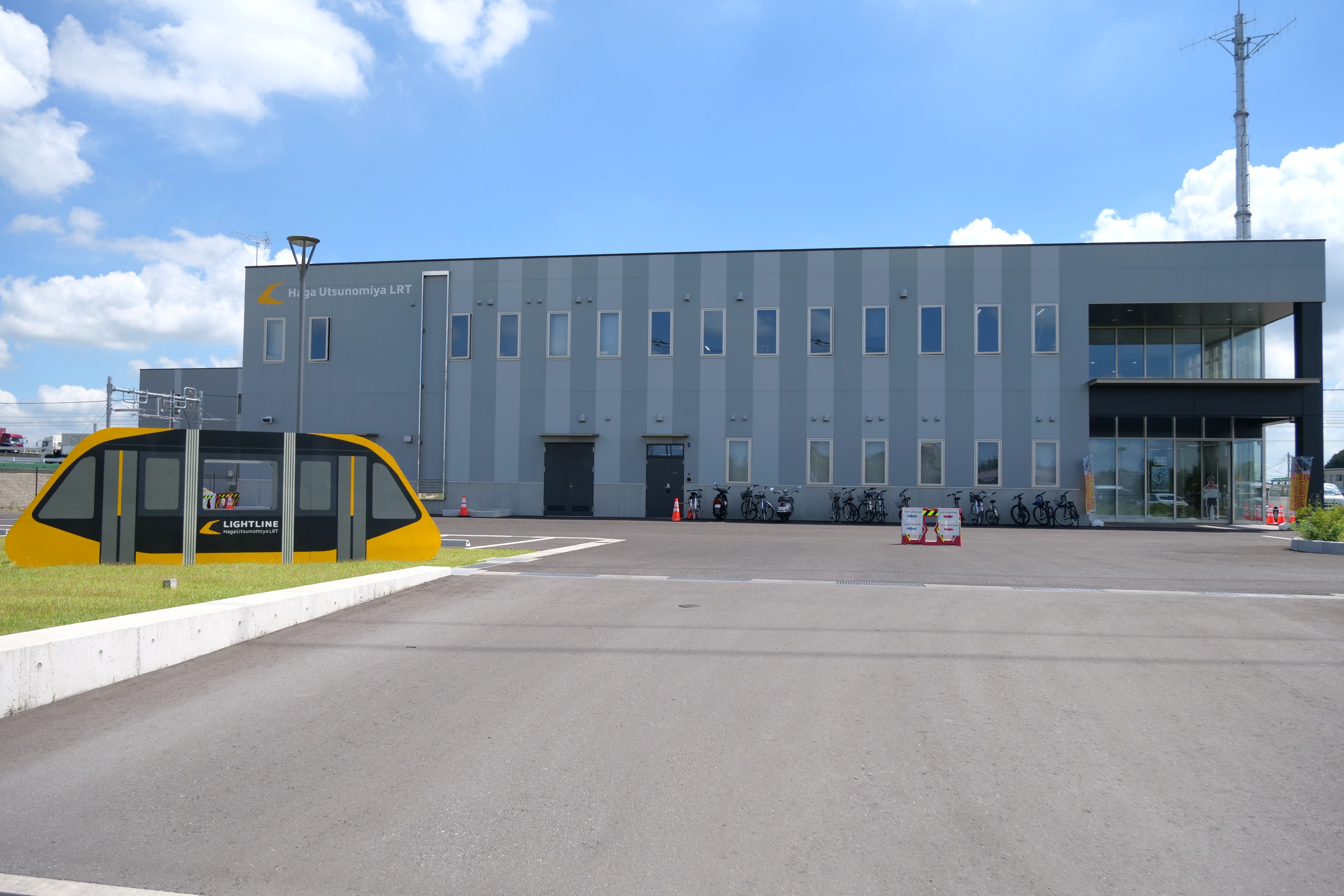
- Headquarters Office and Train yard control building (25 August 2023)
- Native name: 宇都宮ライトレール株式会社
- Romanized name: Utsunomiya raitorēru Kabushiki-gaisha
- Type: Public (kabushiki gaisha)
- Industry: Private railroad
- Founded: 9 November 2015
- Headquarters: 3110, Shimo-Hiraide-machi, Utsunomiya City, Tochigi Prefecture, Japan
- Area served: Tochigi Prefecture
- Owner: Utsunomiya City office 40.80%; Tochigi Lightrail supporting holders 22.80%; Kantō Transportation 11.00%; Haga Town Office 10.20%; The Ashikaga Bank Ltd.5.00%; The Tochigi Bank Ltd.5.00%; Tobu Railway 4.00%; The Utsunomiya Chamber of Commerce and Industry 1.00%; Haga Town commerce and industry committee 0.20%
- Website: www.miyarail.co.jp

The Utsunomiya Light Rail (Japanese: 宇都宮ライトレール, Hepburn: Utsunomiya raitorēru) is a light rail transit (LRT) line serving the Utsunomiya metropolitan area in Tochigi Prefecture, Japan. The 14.6-kilometre (9.1 mi) line links Utsunomiya, the capital city of Tochigi Prefecture, with the nearby town of Haga, running between Utsunomiya Station East, in front of the east exit of Utsunomiya Station, and Haga Takanezawa Industrial Park in Haga.

The line is operated by the third-sector railway company Utsunomiya Light Rail Co., Ltd. (宇都宮ライトレール株式会社, Utsunomiya raitorēru Kabushiki-gaisha) and is officially known as the Utsunomiya Light Rail Utsunomiya Haga Light Rail Line (宇都宮ライトレール宇都宮芳賀ライトレール線).

== History ==
The project to develop a light rail line in Utsunomiya was conceived because of the need to alleviate serious traffic congestion. Since the 1960s, when Japan's economy grew dramatically (Japanese economic miracle), large industrial areas such as Hiraide Industrial Park and Kiyohara Industrial Park were developed in the eastern part of Utsunomiya City, and as many as 30,000 employees came to work there. However, these industrial parks were far from the center of Utsunomiya, and it was necessary to cross the Kinugawa River to access them, so traffic congestion became serious around the limited bridges that crossed the Kinugawa River due to passenger cars driven by commuters and trucks transporting raw materials and products. This is because Tochigi Prefecture is one of the most motorized regions in Japan, and has the highest dependence on automobiles for transportation in this country, so most residents have lived a life that relies on automobiles for transportation. Due to serious traffic congestion, it can take more than an hour to travel 10 to 15 kilometers from the center of Utsunomiya to the industrial parks, and it became a serious social problem that required an immediate solution.

In addition, in the Utsunomiya metropolitan area, the Tōhoku Main Line, a railway trunk line, runs north–south from JR Utsunomiya Station, but there has never been a railway line running east–west. This weakened the east-west regional axis, and the Tōhoku Main Line divided the north and south of the city. Because the center of Utsunomiya is west of Utsunomiya Station, the limited means of transportation other than railways, bus routes, are also concentrated on the west side, and many areas on the east side have difficulty accessing public transportation, let alone bus routes.

In order to fundamentally solve these problems, the idea of developing a monorail connecting the east and west sides of Utsunomiya was proposed by Utsunomiya City office in 1987, but it was not realized. In 1993, the then governor of Tochigi Prefecture came up with the "New Transportation System Concept" to develop a new transportation system connecting Utsunomiya and industrial areas, and serious consideration began for the first time.

In addition to Tochigi Prefecture, Utsunomiya City also participated in the study of the concept, and in 2001 it was decided that the new transportation system would be light rail, and in 2003 a plan was presented for a line that would connect the east and west sides of Utsunomiya City beyond Utsunomiya Station. However, the project did not progress for a long time as there was doubt that it would prove profitable, and conflicts of opinion between Utsunomiya City Hall, the Tochigi Prefecture Governor, and Kantō Transportation (a local bus and small railway company) made it difficult to commercialize the project. However, when the government announced a policy of providing generous subsidies for the development of light rail lines, along with Kantō Transportation changing hands due to a management crisis, the situation changed dramatically, with stakeholders becoming more supportive of the project. In 2013, Utsunomiya City officially decided to develop a light rail line.

Construction started in 2018 with a target opening date of March 2022, which was eventually pushed back to March 2023. This date was later further postponed to 26 August 2023. On 3 April 2023, ten round trips a day of driver proficiency training using the new light rail vehicles began.

The line opened on 26 August 2023. Utsunomiya became the first city in Japan to have a new tram system in 75 years after Takaoka in Toyama Prefecture.

On 13 September 2024, just over a year after opening, the line reached a milestone of 5 million passengers, 20% more than forecast.

== Project overview ==
=== Compact city project ===
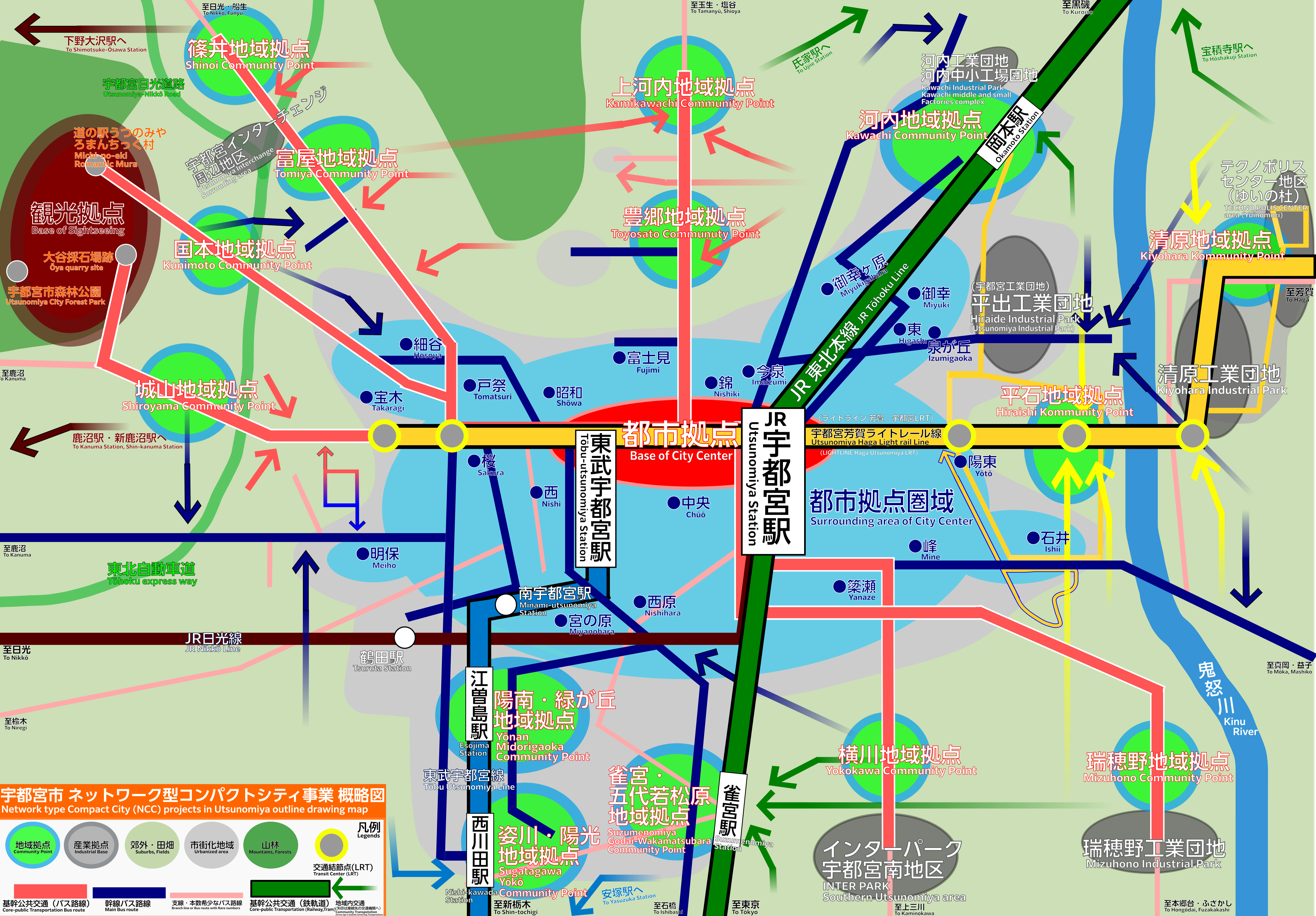
Conceptual map of Compact city project in Utsunomiya

Many regional cities in Japan are suffering from population decline and aging, and Utsunomiya City is no different. Utsunomiya City has been undergoing disorderly development for many years, and urban functions have been dispersed, so it is expected that maintaining urban functions will become difficult as the population decline and aging progresses. To address this issue, Utsunomiya City is promoting the creation of a "Network-based compact city"(NCC) that aims to maintain regional communities and urban functions by consolidating urban functions in each region and connecting the regions with a public transportation network.

The Utsunomiya Light Rail serves as a public transportation axis that runs through Utsunomiya City from east to west, connecting regions and functioning as the center of the public transportation network, playing an important role in the development of a compact city.

=== Route maintenance and operation entity ===
Based on the Japanese law "Act on Revitalization and Reproduction of Regional Public Transportation," the local governments, Utsunomiya City and Haga Town, own the operating facilities such as tracks, stops and rolling stock. Utsunomiya Light Rail Co., Ltd was established as a third-sector joint venture between the local government and companies, and began renting facilities from local governments.

Half of the construction cost is subsidized by the federal government, with the local government bearing the remaining half.

=== "Total design" ===
Since ancient times, the Utsunomiya area has had a climate conducive to summertime thunder, and has the nickname Raito (雷都; thunder city), phonetically mirroring the English word "light". As such, lightning was used as the motif for the design, and under the concept of "From Thunder City to the future: Creating a future mobility city through LRT", a "total design" initiative was implemented to enhance clarity and appeal by giving the vehicles and facilities a unified design based on a unified concept for the facilities. The reasons for choosing lightning were that it has "universality" that makes it enduring and indestructible, "uniqueness" that shows the uniqueness of Utsunomiya City and Haga Town, and "expandability" that can be reflected in the design of a variety of facilities. The image color is yellow, inspired by the color of lightning, and is used for the logo, vehicles, and route color.

On the wall of each stop, "individualized design" is displayed, which is based on the total design and expresses the local climate and culture with the participation of local residents.

== Services ==
List of stops (as of August 2024)

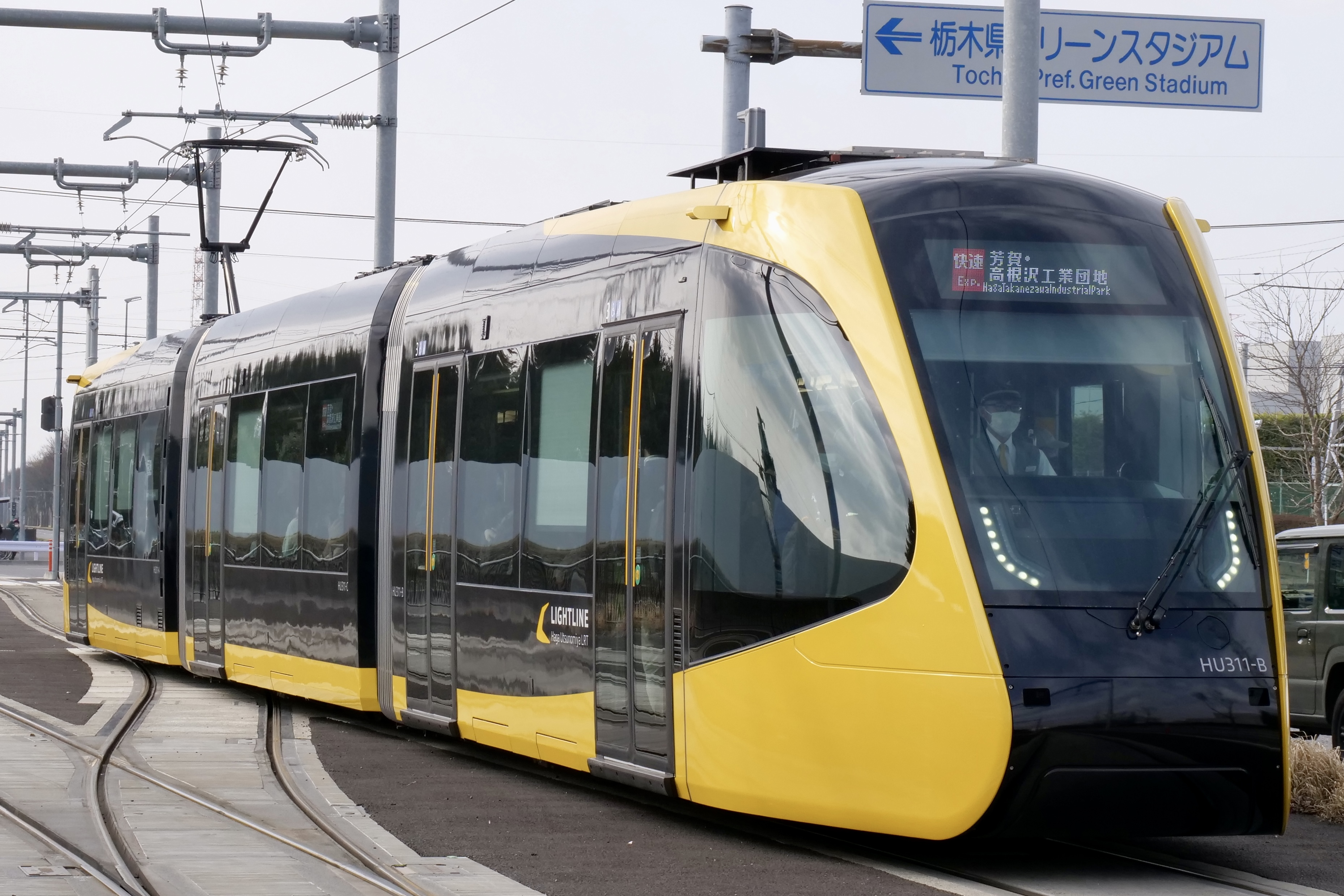
An express train at Green Stadium Station (April 2024)

Almost all trains are local (各駅停車, kakueki teisha) trains that stop at all stations. On weekdays, trains are operated at intervals of 6 to 8 minutes during rush hours (approximately from 6 to 9 and from 5 to 7 pm on weekdays), and at intervals of 12 minutes during other off-peak hours (except during the above-mentioned times on weekdays and holidays). The service is available from 4:00 to 24:00 on weekdays and from 5:00 to 23:00 on weekends and holidays. The train schedule is aligned with that of the Tōhoku Shinkansen, which arrives at and departs from Utsunomiya Station, and connects with the first train on the same line bound for Tokyo Station and the last train arriving at Utsunomiya Station.The time required from the Utsunomiya Station East, the starting point of the train, to the Haga Takanezawa Industrial Park, the ending point, is approximately 44 minutes on weekday schedules and 46 minutes on holiday schedules.

On weekdays, express (快速, kaisoku) trains are available in addition to the local train for the Haga Takanezawa Industrial Park direction only. Express trains stop at Utsunomiya Station East, Utsunomiya University Yoto Campus, Hiraishi, Seiryo High School, and each station from Seiryo High School to Haga and Takanezawa Industrial Park, while other stations are not served.

Fares are based on distance and range from 150 yen to 400 yen for adults one-way. One-day passes, some of which include discounts or free entrance to other attractions, are also available starting from 1,000 yen. Fares can be paid in cash or by Nationwide Mutual Usage Service-compliant IC cards (including Suica, PASMO, and the totra 2-in-1 IC card issued in Utsunomiya). When paying with cash, passengers receive a numbered ticket (整理券, seiriken) from a ticket machine located at the stop, board from the front door of the first car, and disembark from the front door of the first car after inserting the numbered ticket and fare into the fare box. IC card users can board and alight from any door, and touch their card to the IC card readers next to the door when boarding and alighting.

Feeder buses connect the rail line to other areas from stops at Utsunomiya Station East, Utsunomiya University Yoto Campus, Kiyohara District Civic Center, and Haga Industrial Park Management Center.

== Infrastructure ==
=== Rolling stock ===
The line is served by the Utsunomiya Light Rail HU300 series, branded LIGHTLINE. Niigata Transys built and delivered 17 sets of three-section low-floor light rail vehicles. The train was awarded the Laurel Prize by the Japan Railfan Club in 2024. New sets of HU300 series are planned to be introduced in the future, although cost hikes have affected the plan.

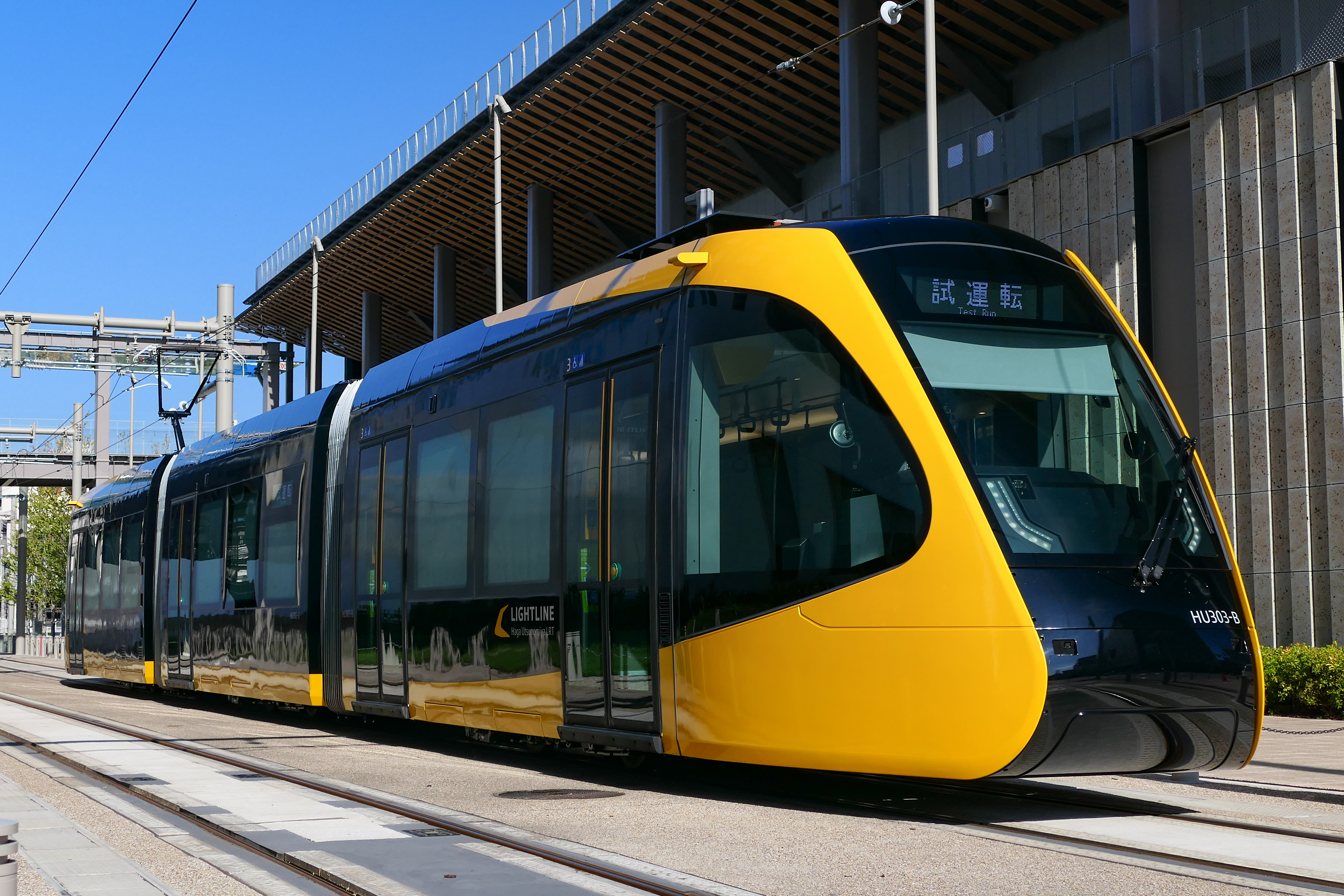
A HU300 series train (21 August 2023)

=== Stations ===
- All stations are located in Tochigi Prefecture.
- Local services stop at all stations.
- Express services stop at stations marked ●, and pass stations marked ↓.

No.	Station	Distance in km (mi)		Express	Transfers	Location
No.	Station	Between stations	Total	Express	Transfers	Location
01	Utsunomiya Station East 宇都宮駅東口	—N/a	0 (0)	●	At Utsunomiya Station: Tōhoku Shinkansen; Shōnan–Shinjuku Line; Utsunomiya Line; ■ Nikkō Line; ■ Karasuyama Line	Utsunomiya
02	Higashi-Shukugo 東宿郷	0.4 (0.25)	0.4 (0.25)	↓		Utsunomiya
03	Ekihigashi Park 駅東公園前	0.4 (0.25)	0.8 (0.50)	↓		Utsunomiya
04	Mine 峰	0.7 (0.43)	1.5 (0.93)	↓		Utsunomiya
05	Yoto 3-chome 陽東3丁目	0.6 (0.37)	2.1 (1.3)	↓		Utsunomiya
06	Utsunomiya University Yoto Campus 宇都宮大学陽東キャンパス	0.7 (0.43)	2.8 (1.7)	●		Utsunomiya
07	Hiraishi 平石	0.9 (0.56)	3.7 (2.3)	●		Utsunomiya
08	Hiraishi-chuo Elementary School 平石中央小学校前	0.5 (0.31)	4.2 (2.6)	↓		Utsunomiya
09	Tobiyama Castle Site 飛山城跡	1.9 (1.2)	6.1 (3.8)	↓		Utsunomiya
10	Seiryo High School 清陵高校前	1.3 (0.81)	7.4 (4.6)	●		Utsunomiya
11	Kiyohara District Civic Center 清原地区市民センター前	0.8 (0.50)	8.2 (5.1)	●		Utsunomiya
12	Green Stadium グリーンスタジアム前	0.8 (0.50)	9.0 (5.6)	●		Utsunomiya
13	Yuinomori-west ゆいの杜西	1.7 (1.1)	10.7 (6.6)	●		Utsunomiya
14	Yuinomori-central ゆいの杜中央	0.5 (0.31)	11.2 (7.0)	●		Utsunomiya
15	Yuinomori-east ゆいの杜東	0.5 (0.31)	11.7 (7.3)	●		Utsunomiya
16	Hagadai 芳賀台	0.7 (0.43)	12.4 (7.7)	●		Haga
17	Haga Industrial Park Management Center 芳賀町工業団地管理センター前	0.5 (0.31)	12.9 (8.0)	●		Haga
18	Kashinomori Park かしの森公園前	0.9 (0.56)	13.8 (8.6)	●		Haga
19	Haga Takanezawa Industrial Park 芳賀・高根沢工業団地	0.7 (0.43)	14.5 (9.0)	●		Haga

=== Future extensions ===
Utsunomiya city has decided to extend the line 5 km westward from its current starting point at Utsunomiya Station East to the Tochigi Education Center (36°34′25″N 139°51′19″E) in the 2030s. The extension is planned to run via Ō-dōri avenue through Tōbu-Utsunomiya Station and Sakura-dōri-Jūmonji intersection (36°33′54″N 139°52′03″E) on National Route 119.

It is also envisioned to extend the line further west from the Tochigi Education Center to the vicinity of the Ōya sightseeing area, a major tourist attraction in Utsunomiya.

==== Planned stations ====
All station names are tentative as of February 2024.

Stations list
Japanese name	Rōmaji English meaning	Transfers	Main Facilities near the station
	Currently opened section (Towards Haga Takanezawa Industrial Park)		
宇都宮駅東口 (Currently)	Utsunomiya-eki Higashiguchi (Utsunomiya Station East)	JR Lines (Utsunomiya Station), Route Buses	
JR宇都宮駅西口	JR Utsunomiya-eki Nishiguchi (JR Utsunomiya Station West entrance)	JR Lines (Utsunomiya Station), Route Buses	
上河原	Kamigawara		
宮島町十文字	Miyajimachō-Jūmonji		
馬場町	Babachō		Utsunomiya Futarayama Shrine
県庁前	Kenchō mae (Prefectual office)		Tochigi Prefectual office Tochigi Prefecture Cultural Center; Utsunomiya City office
東武宇都宮駅前	Tōbu-Utsunomiya-eki mae (Tōbu-Utsunomiya Station)	Tōbu Utsunomiya Line, Route Buses	Tōbu-Utsunomiya Station and Department store Orion Street mall
裁判所前	Saibansho mae (Courthouse)		Utsunomiya District Court
新川	Shinkawa		
桜通り十文字	Sakura-Dōri-Jūmonji	Route Buses	
美術館前	Bijutsukan mae (Art museum)		Tochigi Prefectual Museum of Fine Arts
護国神社前	Gokoku Jinja mae (Gokoku Shrine)		Tochigi Gokoku Shrine; Sakushin Gakuin High School; Utsunomiya Bunsei Girls High School
教育会館前	Kyōiku Kaikan mae (Education Center)		Tochigi Education Center; Concere (Tochigi Prefectual Youth Hall)

== See also ==
- List of tram and light rail transit systems
- List of urban rail systems in Japan
- List of railway lines in Japan
- List of railway companies in Japan
