= Haga, Tochigi =

Haga 芳賀町
- Town
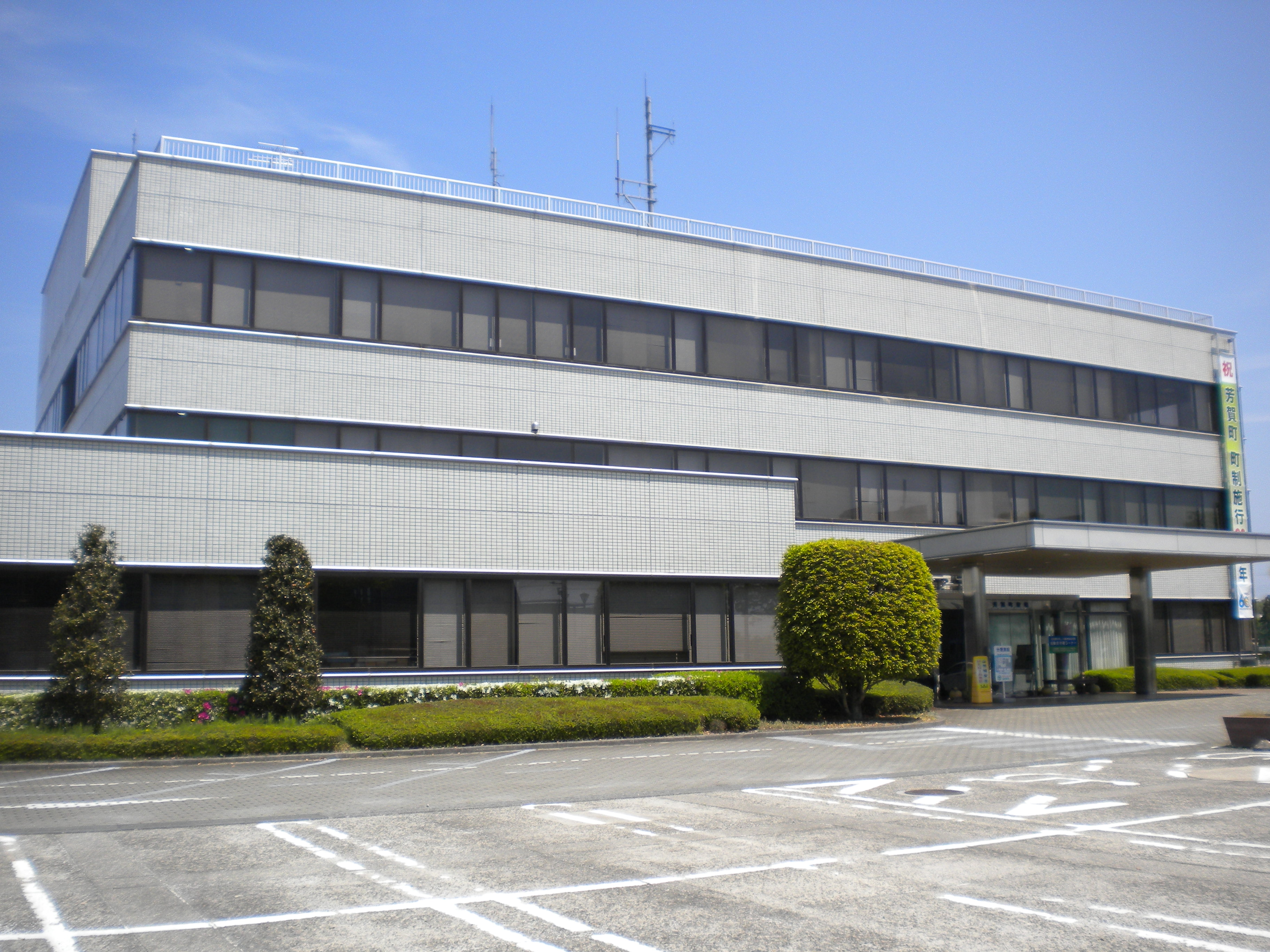
- Haga Town Office

- Flag Seal

- Location of Haga in Tochigi Prefecture

- Coordinates: 36°32′53.7″N 140°03′29.6″E
- Country: Japan
- Region: Kantō
- Prefecture: Tochigi
- District: Haga

Government
  - Mayor: Tadashi Kenmoku

Area
  - Total: 70.16 km^{2} (27.09 sq mi)

Population (July 2020)
  - Total: 15,661
  - Density: 223.2/km^{2} (578.1/sq mi)
- Time zone: UTC+9 (Japan Standard Time)
- Tree: Zelkova serrata
- Flower: Chinese pear
- Bird: Eurasian skylark
- Phone number: 028-677-1111
- Address: Ubagai 1020, Haga-machi, Haga-gun, Tochigi-ken 321-3392
- Website: Official website

Haga (芳賀町, Haga-machi) is a town in Tochigi Prefecture, Japan. As of 1 August 2020, the town had an estimated population of 15,661 in 5,658 households, and a population density of 220 persons per km^{2}. The total area of the town is 70.16 square kilometres (27.09 sq mi). .

== Geography ==
Haga is located in southeastern Tochigi Prefecture. The river Gogyō, a tributary of the river Kokaigawa flows through Haga.

== Surrounding municipalities ==
Tochigi Prefecture

- Ichikai
- Mooka
- Takanezawa
- Utsunomiya

== Demographics ==
Per Japanese census data, the population of Haga has declined in recent decades.

Historical population
Year	Pop.	±%
1920	14,603	—
1930	15,465	+5.9%
1940	16,080	+4.0%
1950	20,677	+28.6%
1960	18,627	−9.9%
1970	16,169	−13.2%
1980	16,669	+3.1%
1990	17,610	+5.6%
2000	16,988	−3.5%
2010	16,003	−5.8%
2020	14,961	−6.5%

== History ==
Ubagai, Minatakazeawa and Mizuhashi villages were created within Haga District on 1 April 1889 with the creation of the modern municipalities system. Ubagai was elevated to town status on 1 November 1928. Ubagai merged with Minatakanezawa and Mizuhashi to form Haga on 31 March 1954.

== Government ==
Haga has a mayor-council form of government with a directly elected mayor and a unicameral town council of 13 members. Haga, together with the other municipalities in Haga District collectively contributes two members to the Tochigi Prefectural Assembly. In terms of national politics, the town is part of Tochigi 4th district of the lower house of the Diet of Japan.

- Town Mayor: 見目匡 Tadashi Kenmoku (Eighth Mayor of Haga, Mayor since 18 May 2015)
- Town Deputy Mayor: 上野哲男 Tetsuo Ueno (13th Deputy Mayor of Haga, Deputy Mayor since 15 June 2015)
- Superintendent of Education: 見目政子 Masako Kenmoku (Seventh Superintendent of Education, Superintendent of Education since 1 November 2012)

== Economy ==
Major companies located at Haga-machi industrial complex include:

- AutoTechnicJapan Co., Ltd.
- F-Tech Inc.
- Honda Engineering Co., Ltd.
- Honda R&D Co., Ltd.
- Kandenko Co., Ltd.
- Kawasaki Microelectronics, Inc.
- Kotobukido
- Marujun Co., Ltd.
- Sannotec
- Showa Corporation
- Yanagawa Seiki Co., Ltd.

== Education ==
Haga has three public primary schools and one public middle school operated by the town government. The town does not have a high school.

== Transportation ==
=== Railway ===
Haga is since August 2023 served by Utsunomiya Light Rail.

=== Highway ===
- National Route 123
- Tochigi Prefectural Roads: 61, 64, 69, 154, 156, 165, 255, 388.
- Roadside stations: Roadside Station Haga.

=== Buses ===
JR Bus Kantō: Sakushin Gakuin-mae – Twin Ring Motegi via Utsunomiya Station and Motegi Station, Sakushin Gakuin mae – Saga-Onsen Roman no Yu via Utsunomiya Station.

=== Heliports ===
Tochigi Heliport

== Local attractions ==
- Haga Tenman-gu shrine

== Notable people from Haga ==
- Yukiko Akaba, long-distance runner.
