= KiHa 40 series =

Japanese train type

KiHa 40 series KiHa 41 KiHa 47 KiHa 48
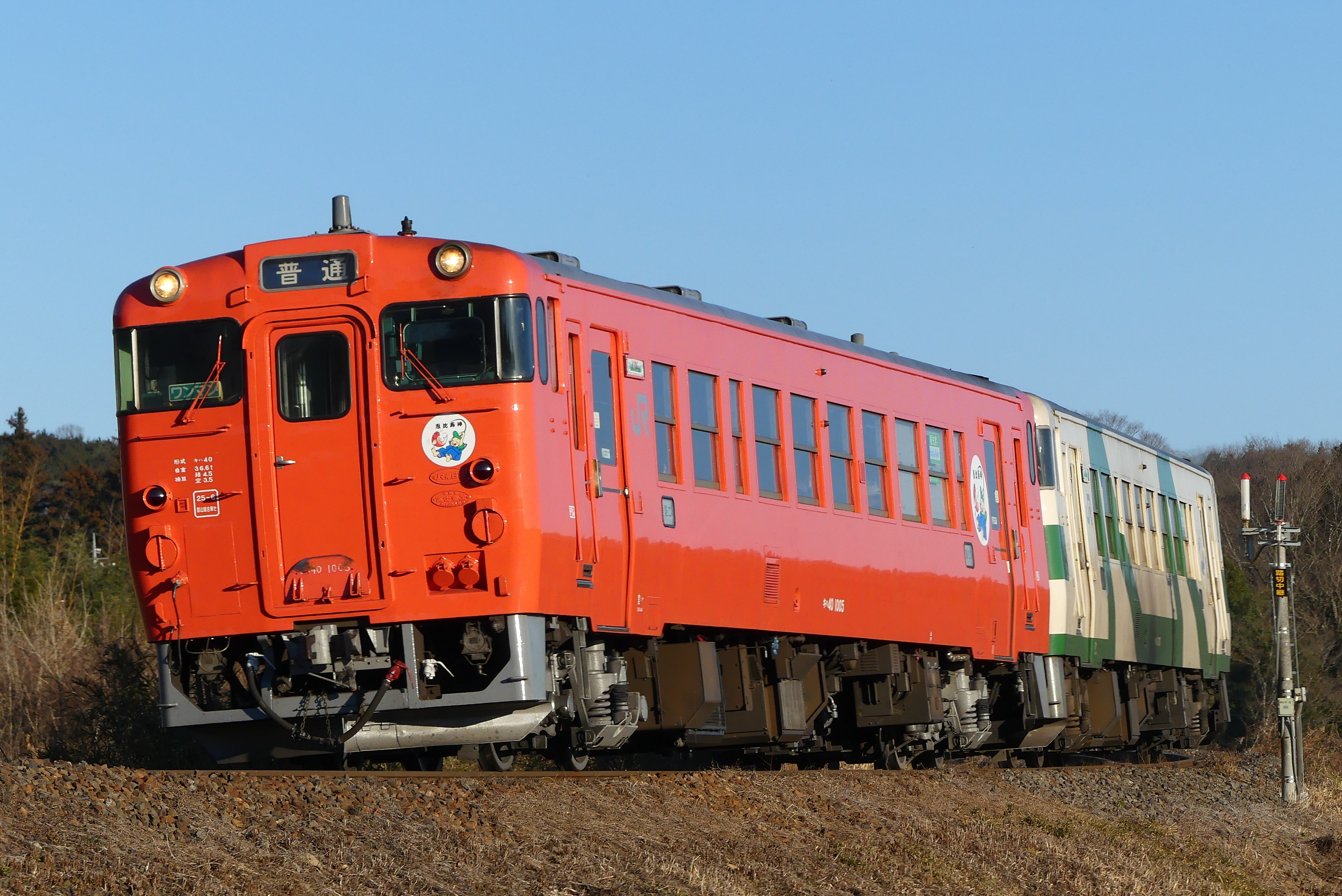
- A pair of JR East KiHa 40 series units on the Karasuyama Line in January 2017
- In service: 1977–present
- Manufacturers: Fuji Heavy Industries, Niigata Tekkō
- Replaced: KiHa 10 series; KiHa 30; KiHa 130
- Constructed: 1977–1983
- Number built: 888 vehicles
- Number in service: 714 vehicles (as of 2018)
- Successor: KiHa E120; HB-E300 series; EV-E301 series; GV-E400 series; EV-E801 series; BEC819 series; H100 series; 733 series
- Formation: Various
- Operators: JNR (1977–1987); JR Central (1987–2016); JR Hokkaido; JR East; JR-West; JR Shikoku; JR Kyushu (1987–present); Myanmar Railways (2011–present); Nishikigawa Railway (2017–present); Kominato Railway (2020–present); Hojo Railway (2022–present); State Railway of Thailand (2026–present)
- Depot: Various
- Line served: Various

Specifications
- Car body construction: Steel
- Car length: 21,300 mm (69 ft 11 in)
- Width: 2,900 mm (9 ft 6 in)
- Doors: 2 per side
- Maximum speed: 95 km/h (59 mph)
- Transmission: DW10 (hydraulic)
- Multiple working: KiHa 58 (San'in Main Line only)
- Track gauge: 1,067 mm (3 ft 6 in); 1,000 mm (3 ft 3 3/8 in) metre gauge (Myanmar, Thailand)

The KiHa 40 series (Japanese: キハ40系, Hepburn: Kiha-yonjū-kei) are diesel multiple unit (DMU) railcars introduced by Japanese National Railways (JNR) in 1977 for non-electrified suburban and rural services in Japan. Operation was transferred to the various Japan Railways Group companies following the privatization of JNR.

Since 2017, withdrawn units have been purchased by private railway companies in Japan. The series has also been used overseas by Myanma Railways in Myanmar and the State Railway of Thailand in Thailand.

The "KiHa" designation derives from the classification system used by JNR. "Ki" indicates a diesel-powered vehicle, while "Ha" indicates an ordinary passenger car, as opposed to a green car.

A total of 888 vehicles were built between 1977 and 1983 by Fuji Heavy Industries and Niigata Tekkō.

== Overview ==
The KiHa 40 series diesel multiple unit was introduced in 1977 by JNR to replace ageing KiHa 10 series DMUs on suburban and rural services nationwide. A total of 888 vehicles were built between 1977 and 1982, broadly divided into three main types: KiHa 40, KiHa 47, and KiHa 48. These were subdivided as shown below, with further variants and modifications made later in their lives by the various JR Group companies.

Type	No. of cabs	Doors	Subclass	Region	Toilet	Quantity	Numbering	Remarks
KiHa 40	2	Single-leaf	-100	Hokkaido (Extreme cold)	Yes	150	101–250	
KiHa 40	2	Single-leaf	-500	Cold	Yes	94	501–594	
KiHa 40	2	Single-leaf	-1000	Warm	No	148	1001–1007	Former KiHa 40-2000 cars with toilets removed
KiHa 40	2	Single-leaf	-2000	Warm	Yes	148	2001–2148	
KiHa 47	1	Pairs	-0	Warm	Yes	193	1–193	
KiHa 47	1	Pairs	-500	Cold	Yes	22	501–522	
KiHa 47	1	Pairs	-1000	Warm	No	134	1001–1134	
KiHa 47	1	Pairs	-1500	Cold	No	21	1501–1521	
KiHa 48	1	Single-leaf	-0	Warm	Yes	6	1–6	
KiHa 48	1	Single-leaf	-300	Hokkaido (Extreme cold)	Yes	4	301–304	
KiHa 48	1	Single-leaf	-500	Cold	Yes	59	501–559	
KiHa 48	1	Single-leaf	-1000	Warm	No	4	1001–1004	
KiHa 48	1	Single-leaf	-1300	Hokkaido (Extreme cold)	No	3	1301–1303	
KiHa 48	1	Single-leaf	-1500	Cold	No	50	1501–1550	

"Cold" regions refers to the Tohoku and Chubu regions.

== JR Hokkaido ==
Following the privatization and splitting of JNR in April 1987, JR Hokkaido received a total of 157 KiHa 40 series vehicles (150 KiHa 40s and 7 KiHa 48s). As of 1 April 2010, JR Hokkaido operates 153 KiHa 40 series vehicles, classified as follows.

- KiHa 40 (-300, -330, -350, -400, -700 and -1700)
- KiHa 48-1300
- KiHa 400-100
- KiHa 480 (-300 and -1300)
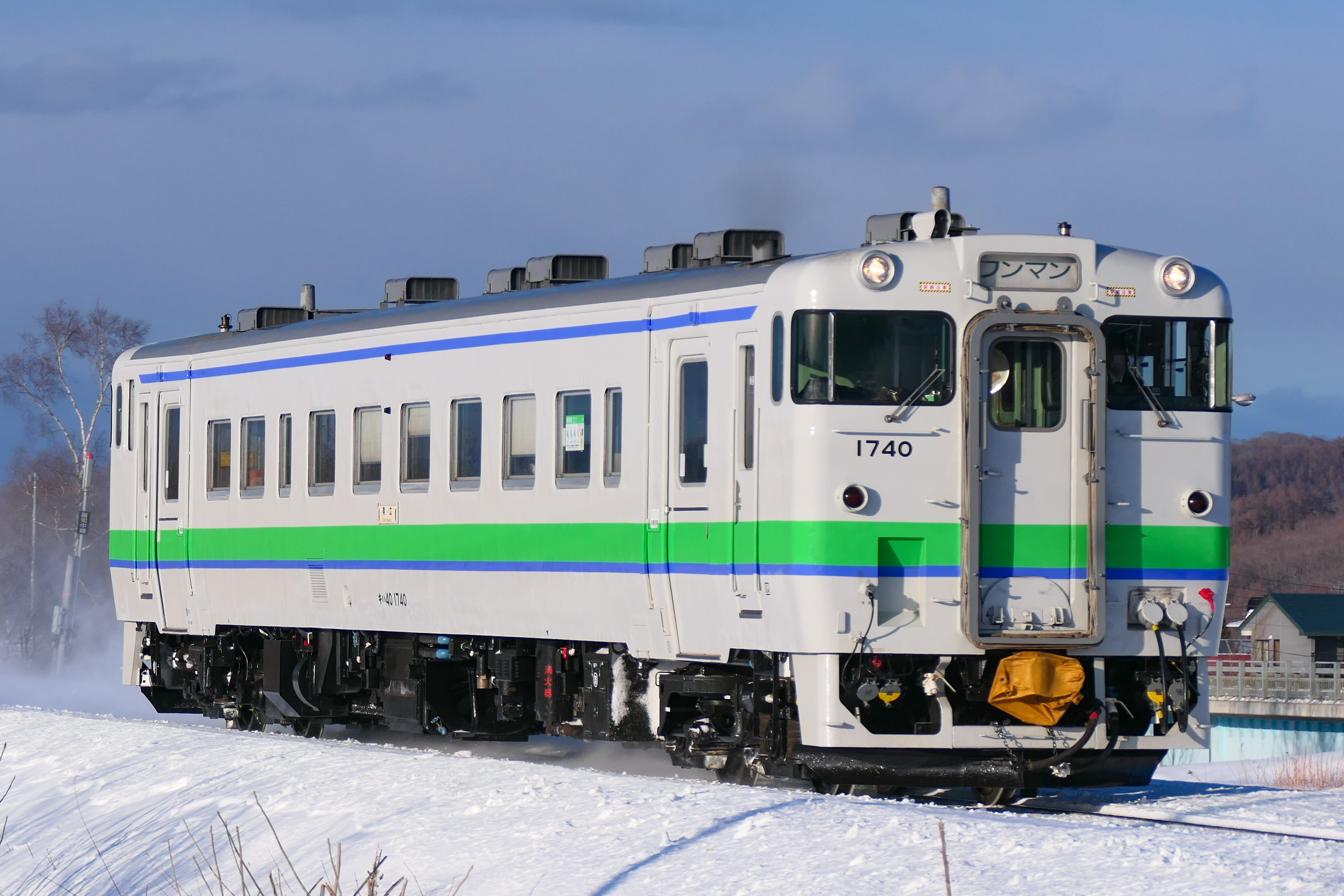
KiHa 40 1740 in February 2022

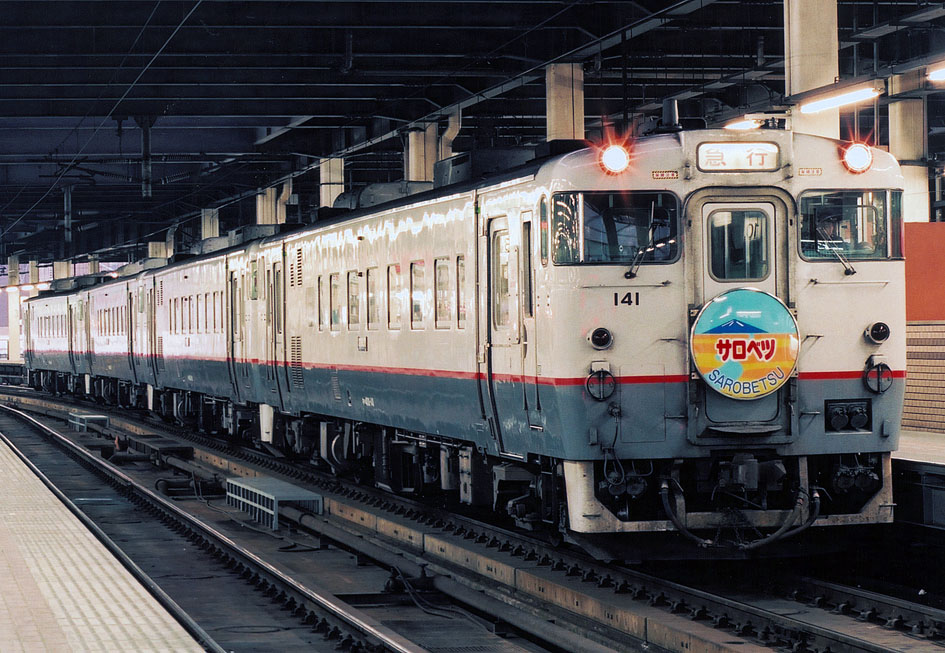
KiHa 400-141

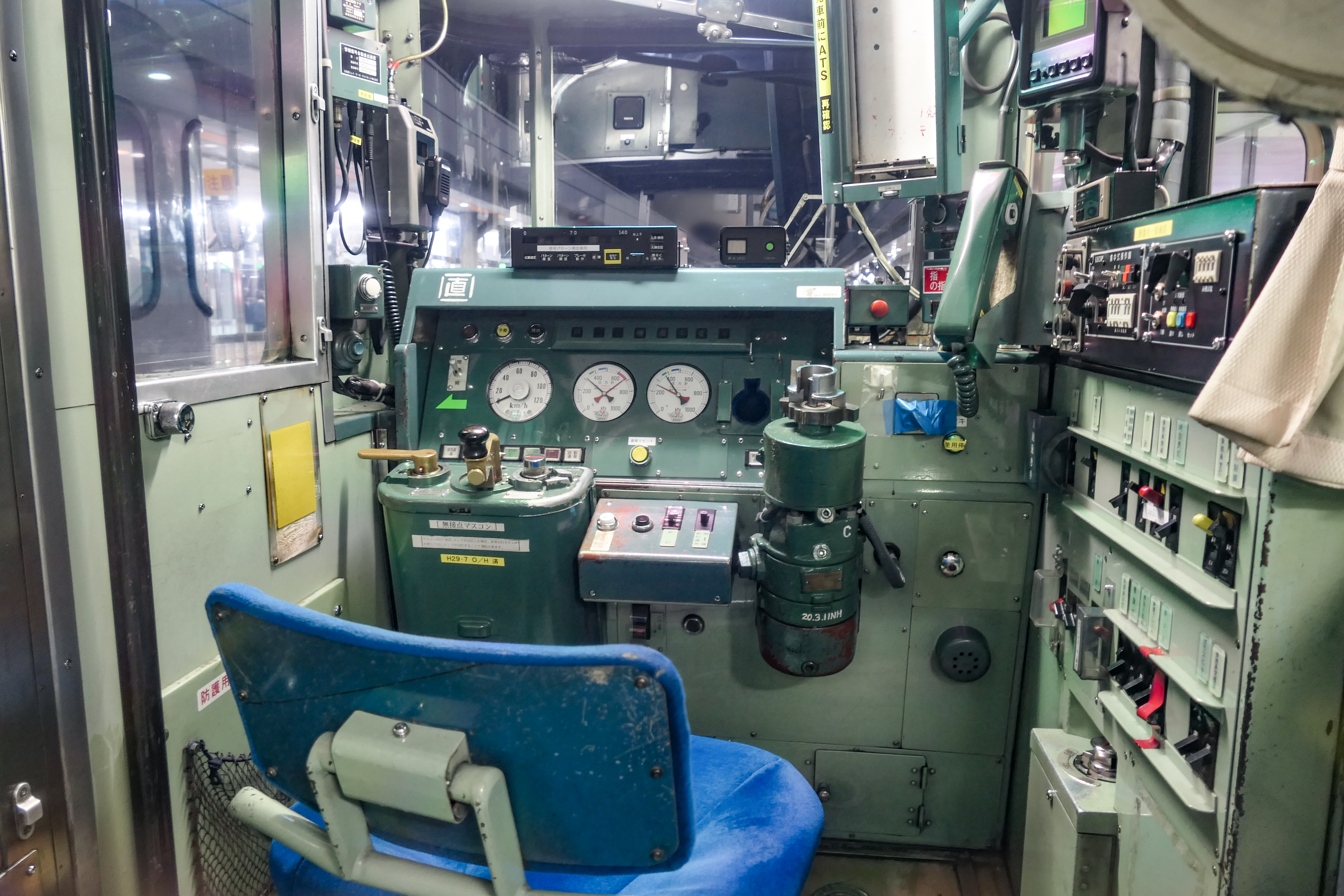
Driver's cab of KiHa 40 1755 in September 2021

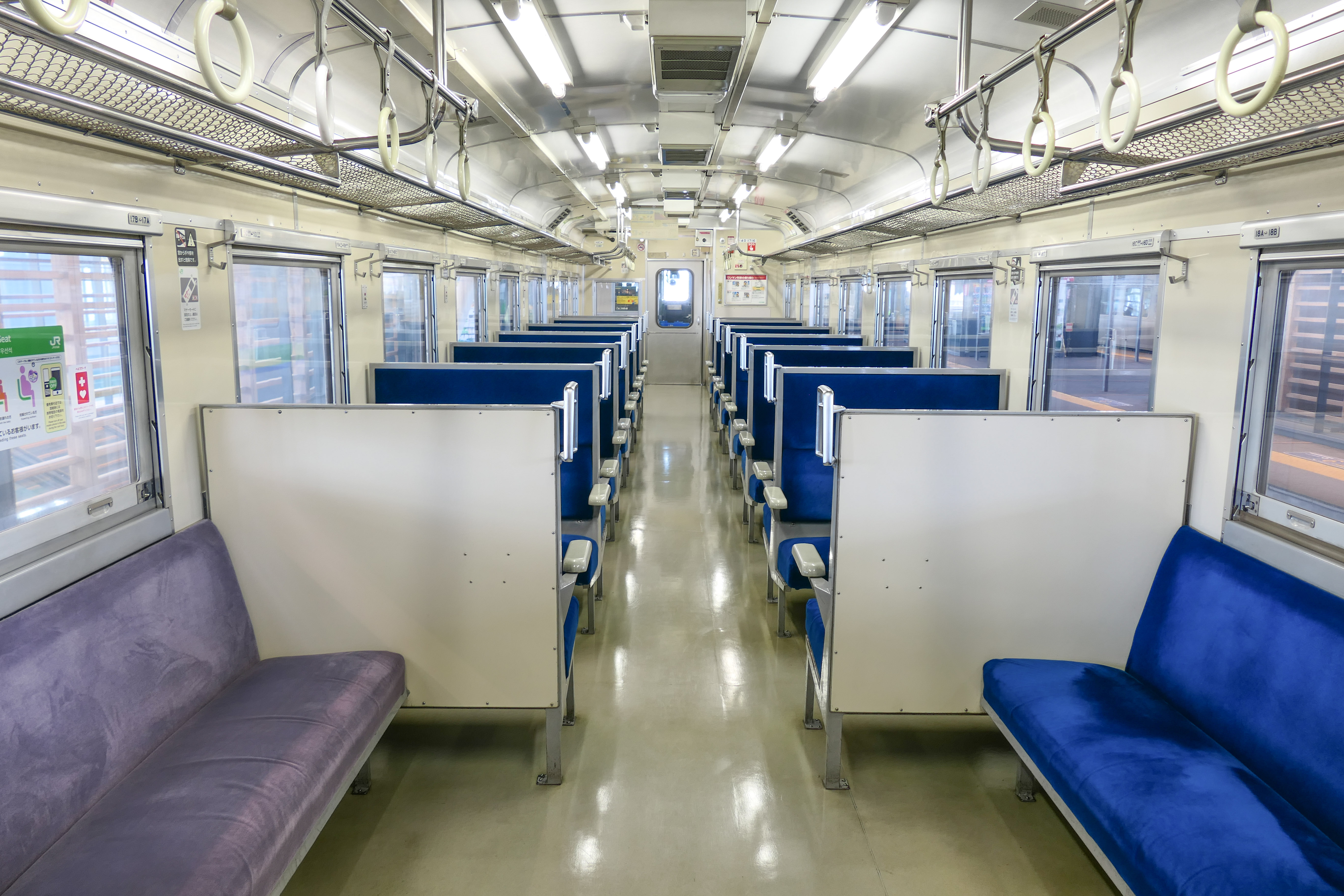
Interior of KiHa 40 1716 in May 2021

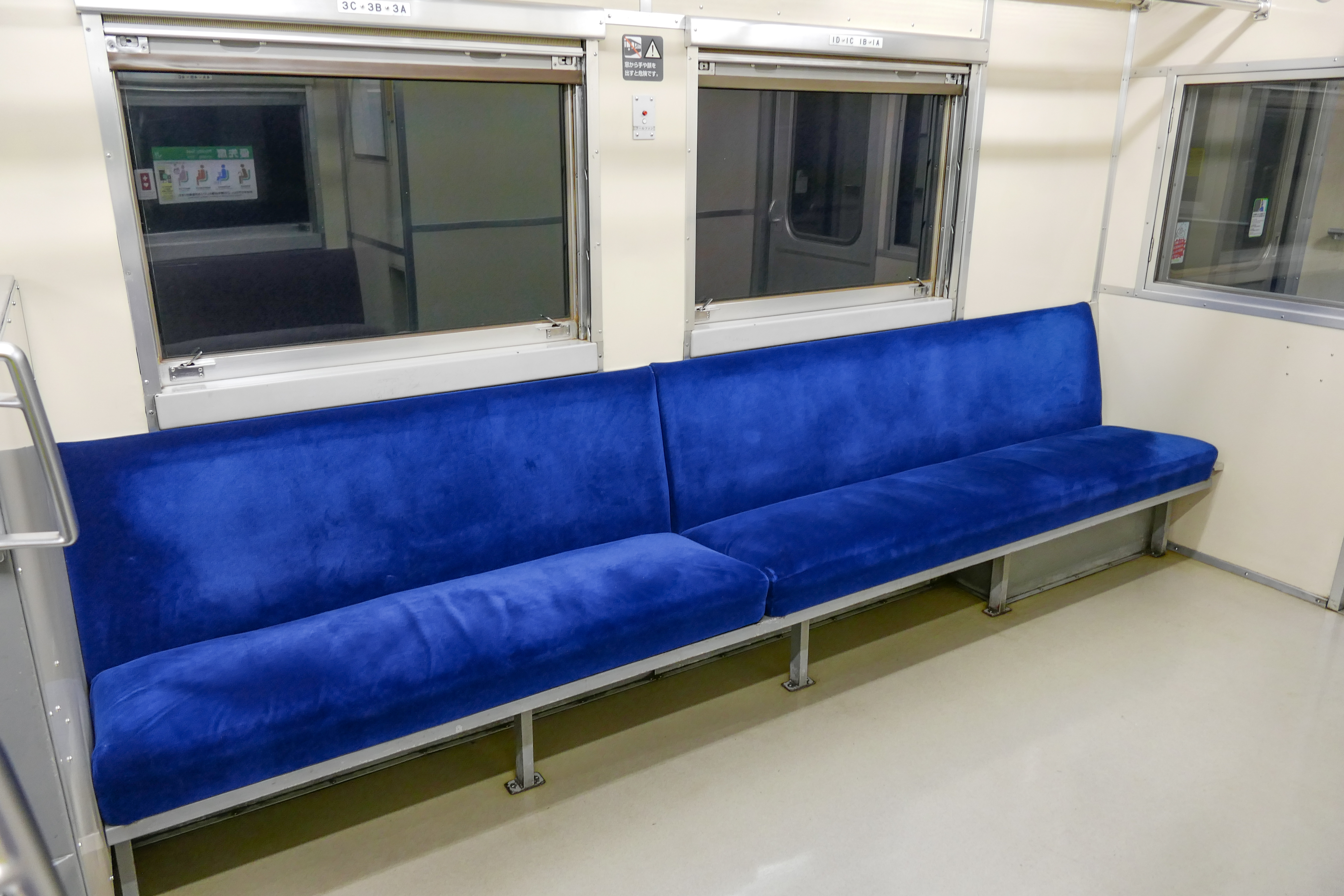
Longitudinal seating of KiHa 40 1755 in September 2021

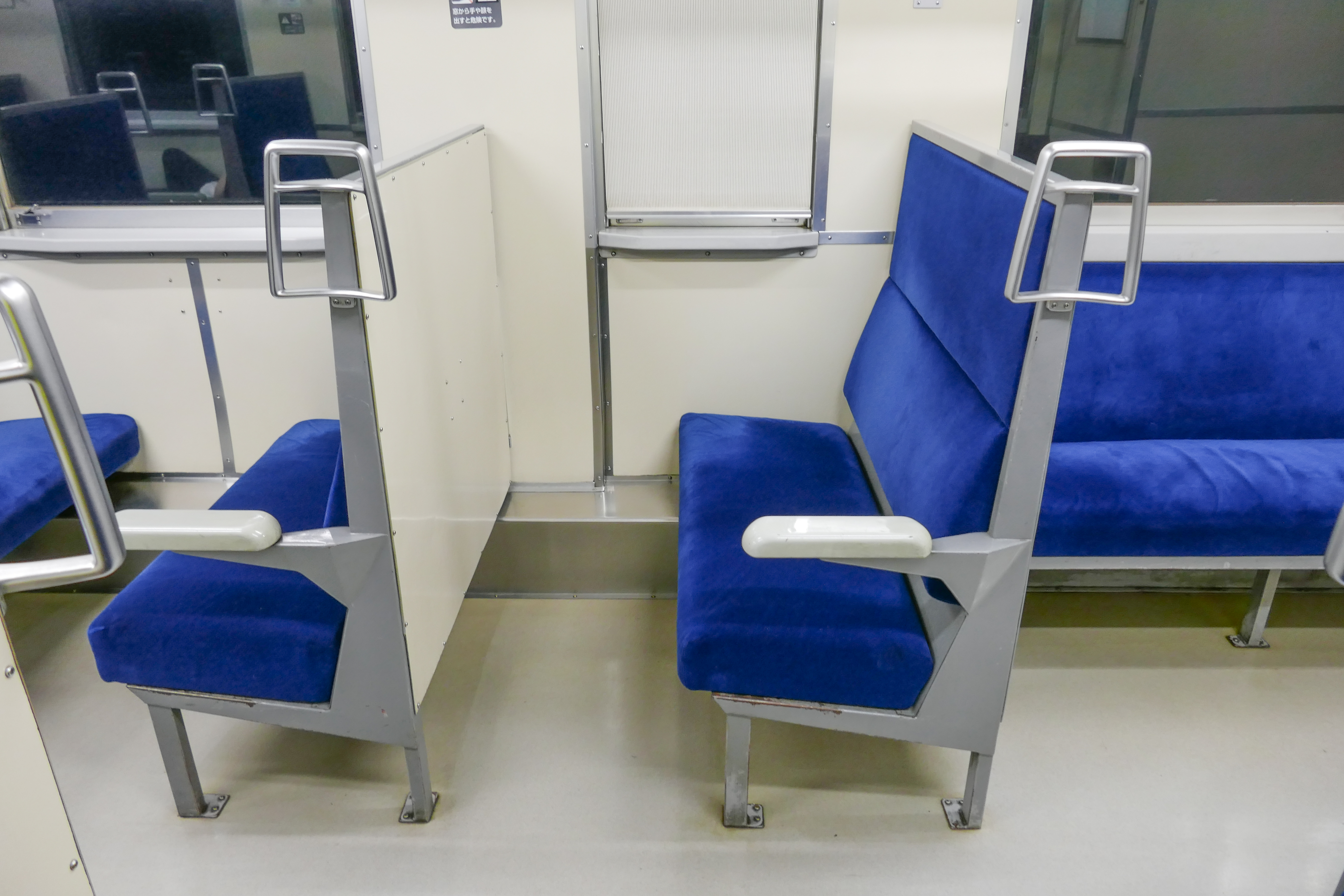
Cross seating of KiHa 40 1755 in September 2021

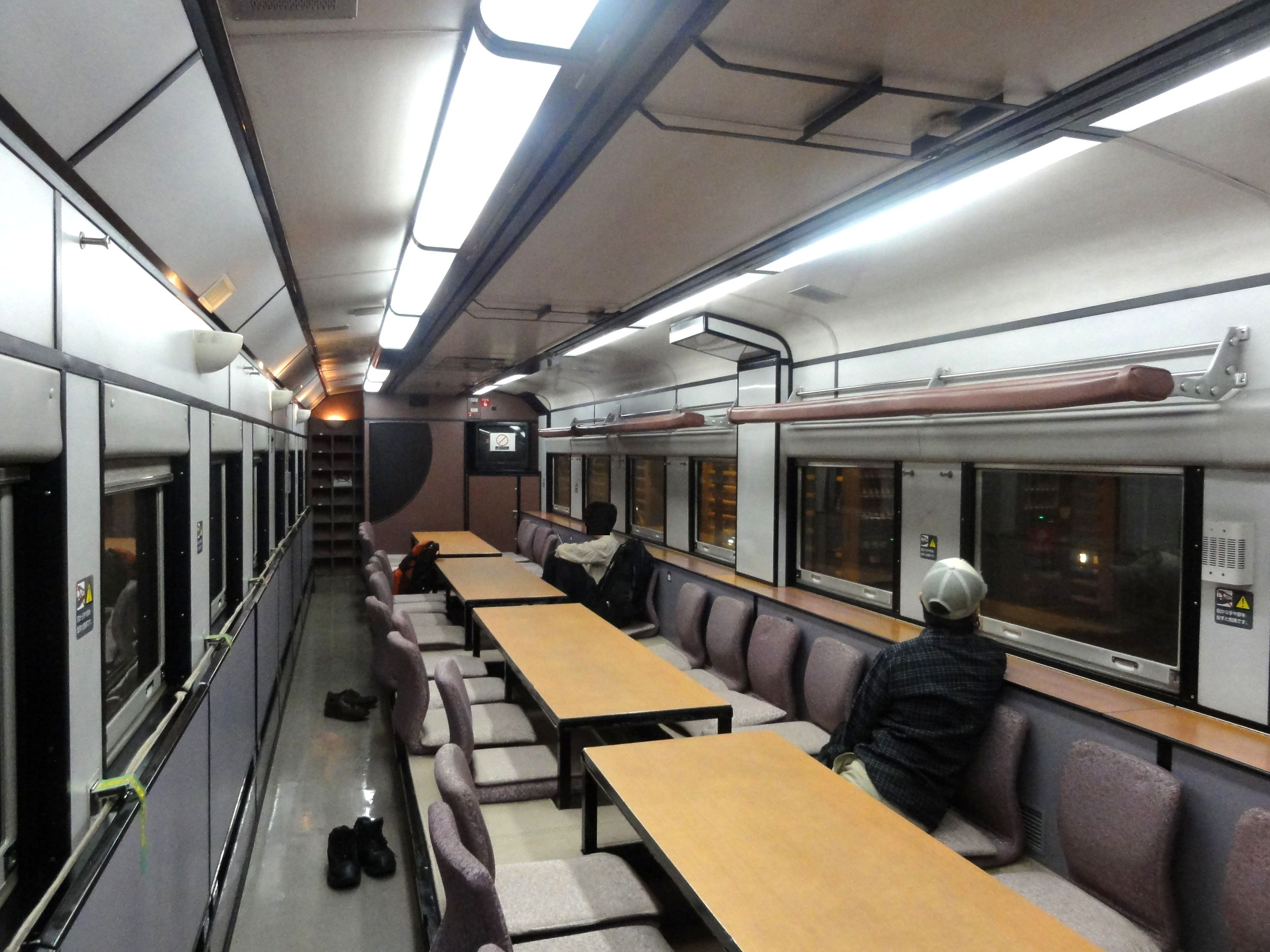
Interior of KiHa 400-502

== JR East ==
Following the privatization and splitting of JNR in April 1987, JR East received a total of 219 KiHa 40 series vehicles (117 KiHa 40s, 28 KiHa 47s, and 74 KiHa 48s). As of 1 April 2010, JR East operates 159 KiHa 40 series vehicles, classified as follows.

- KiHa 40 (-500, -1000 and -2000)
- KiHa 47 (-0, -500, -1000 and -1500)
- KiHa 48 (-500 and -1500)

KiHa 48-502 and KiHa 48-1512 were derailed and badly damaged by the 2011 Tōhoku earthquake and tsunami on 11 March 2011, and were withdrawn.

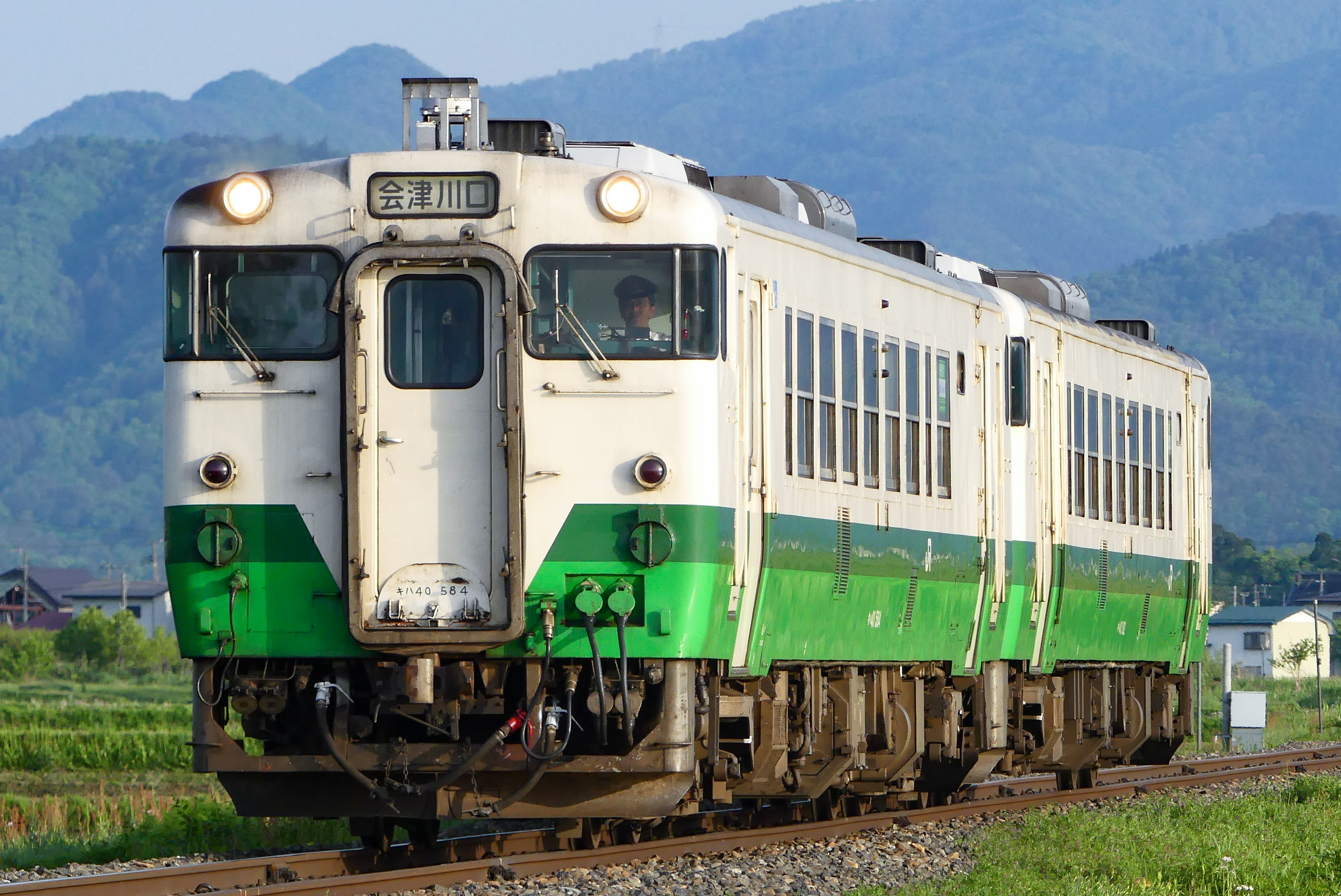
KiHa 40 584 in May 2018, Tohoku livery on Tadami Line

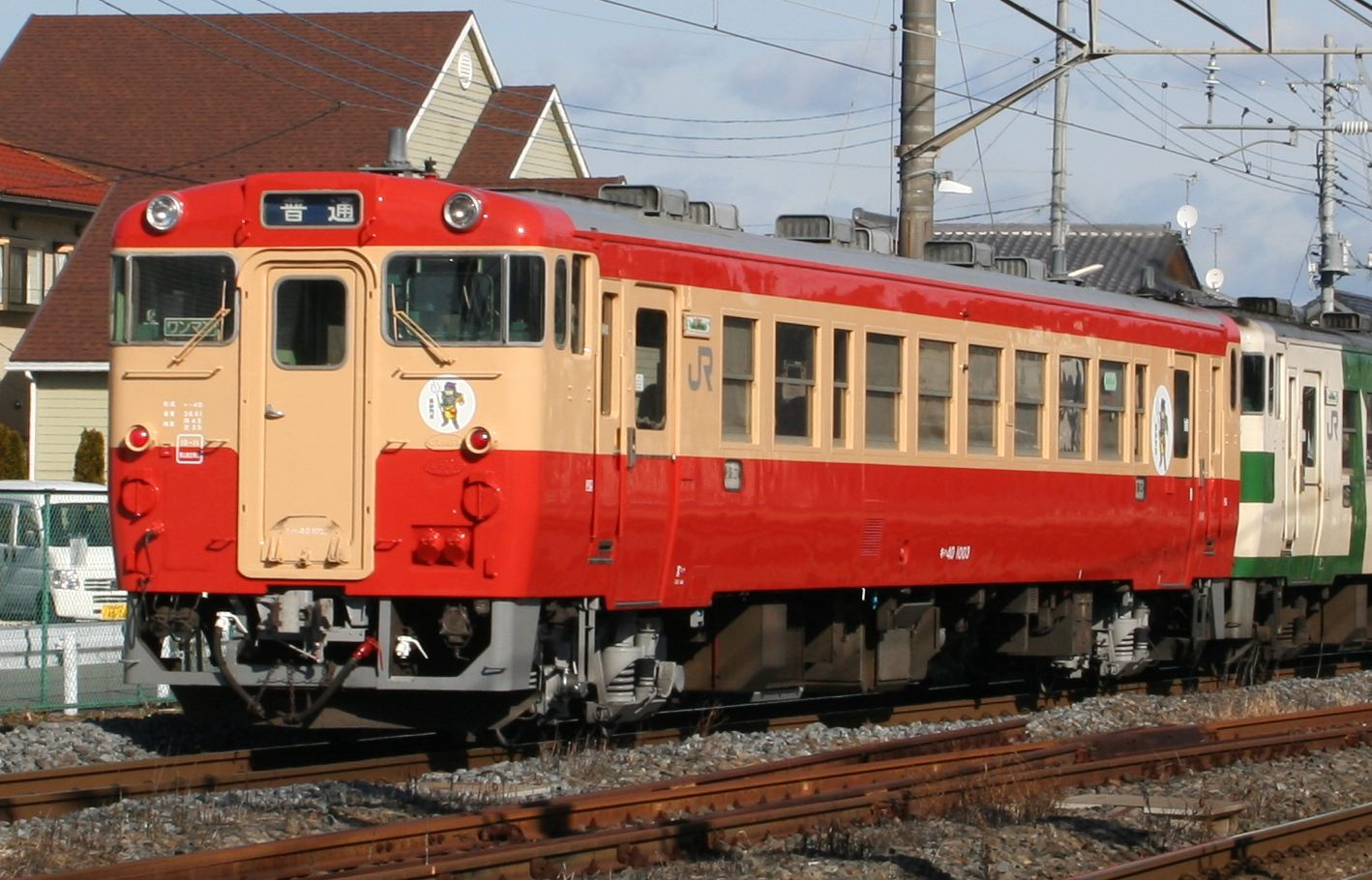
KiHa 40 1003 in January 2011, repainted into old JNR livery

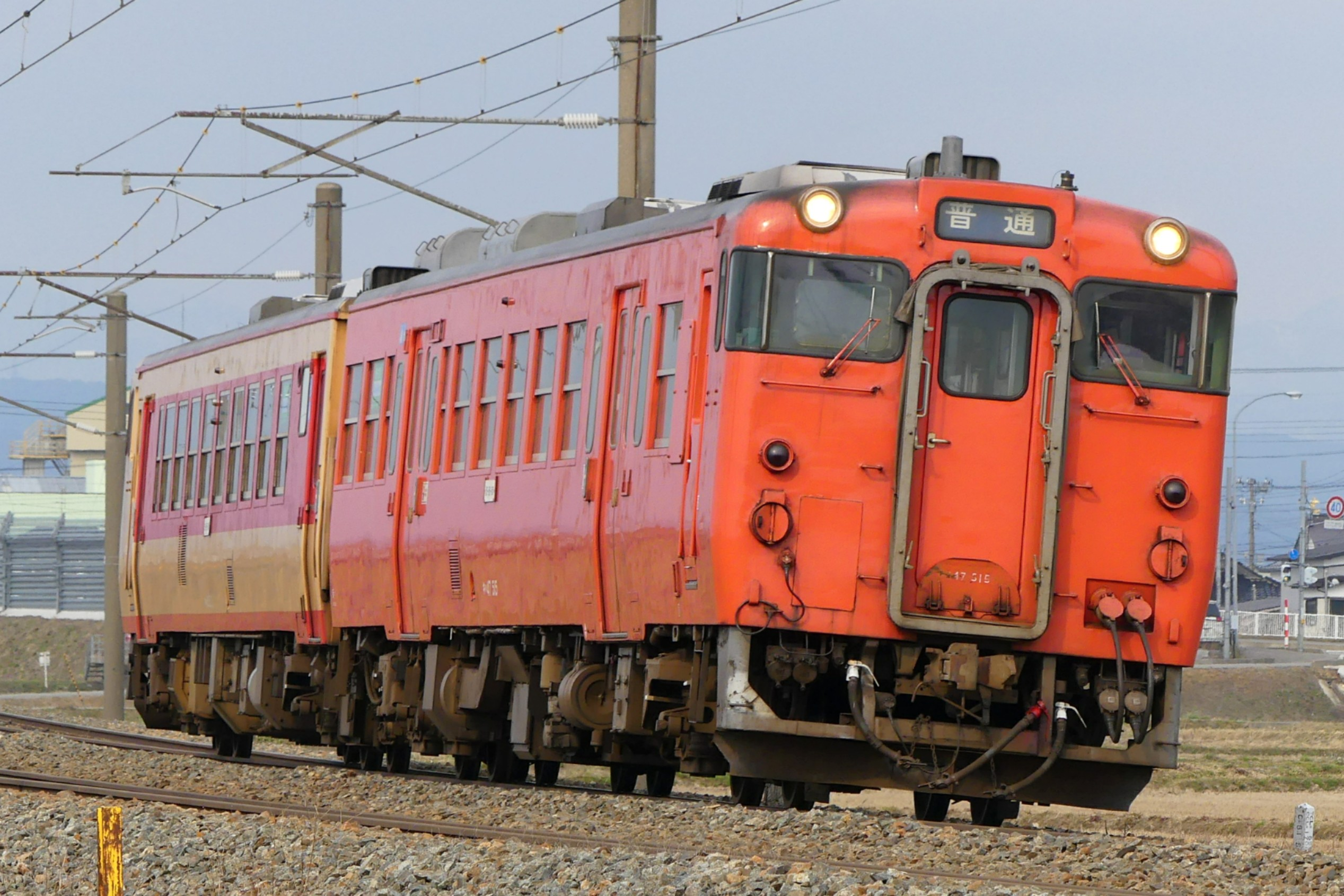
KiHa 47 515 in March 2017

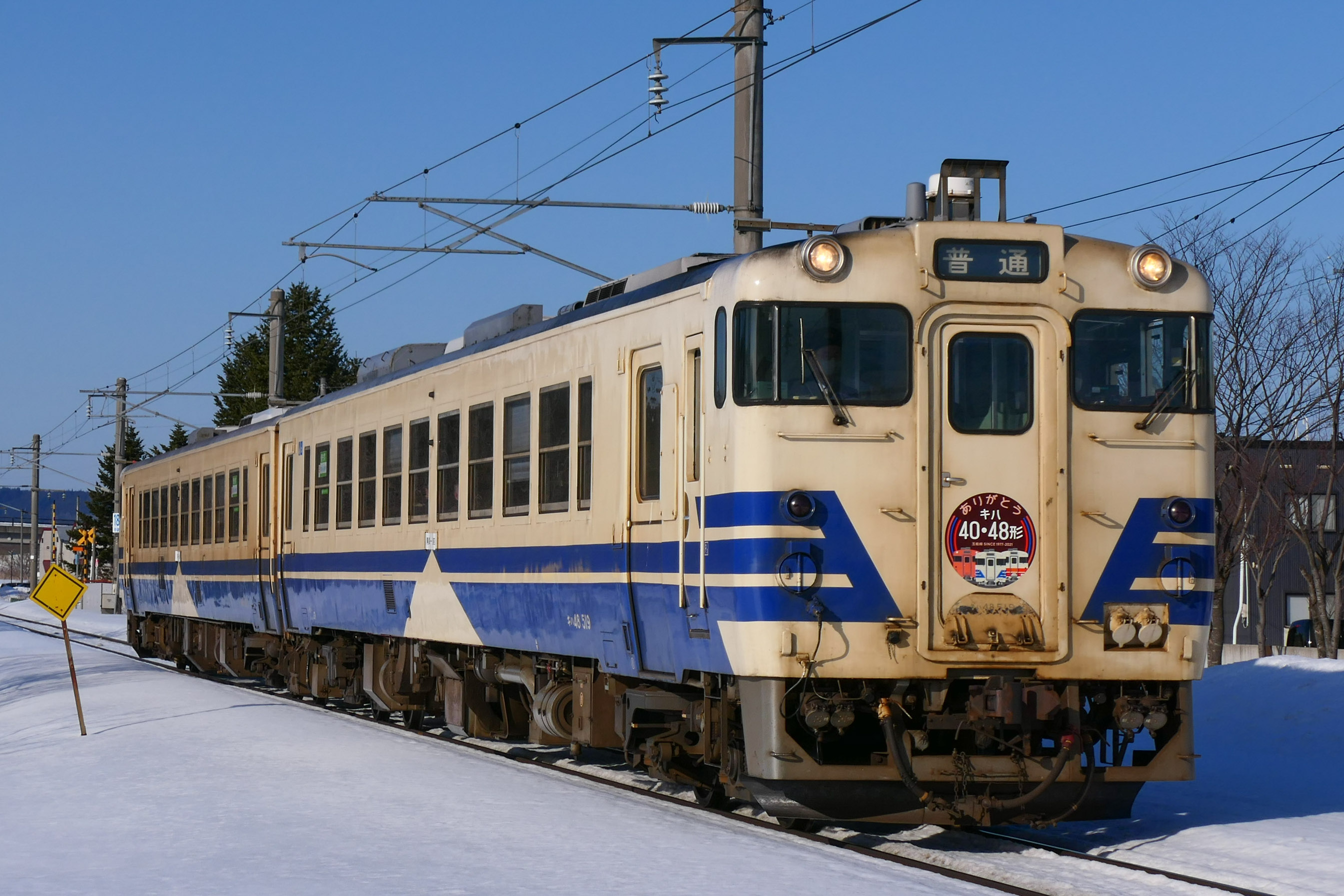
KiHa 48 519 in February 2021, Gono livery on Ōu Main Line

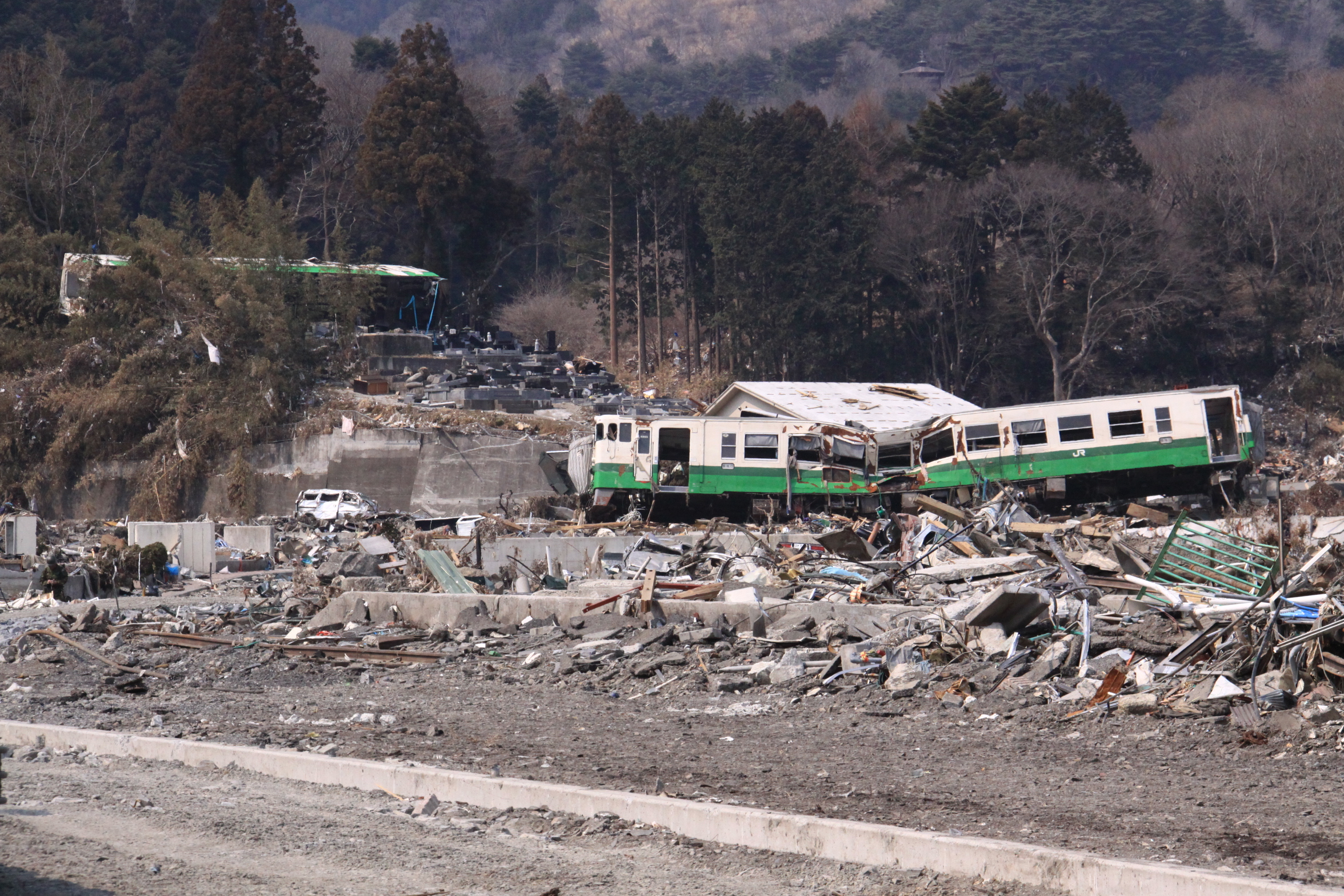
KiHa 48 502 and KiHa 48 1512 after the tsunami in 2011

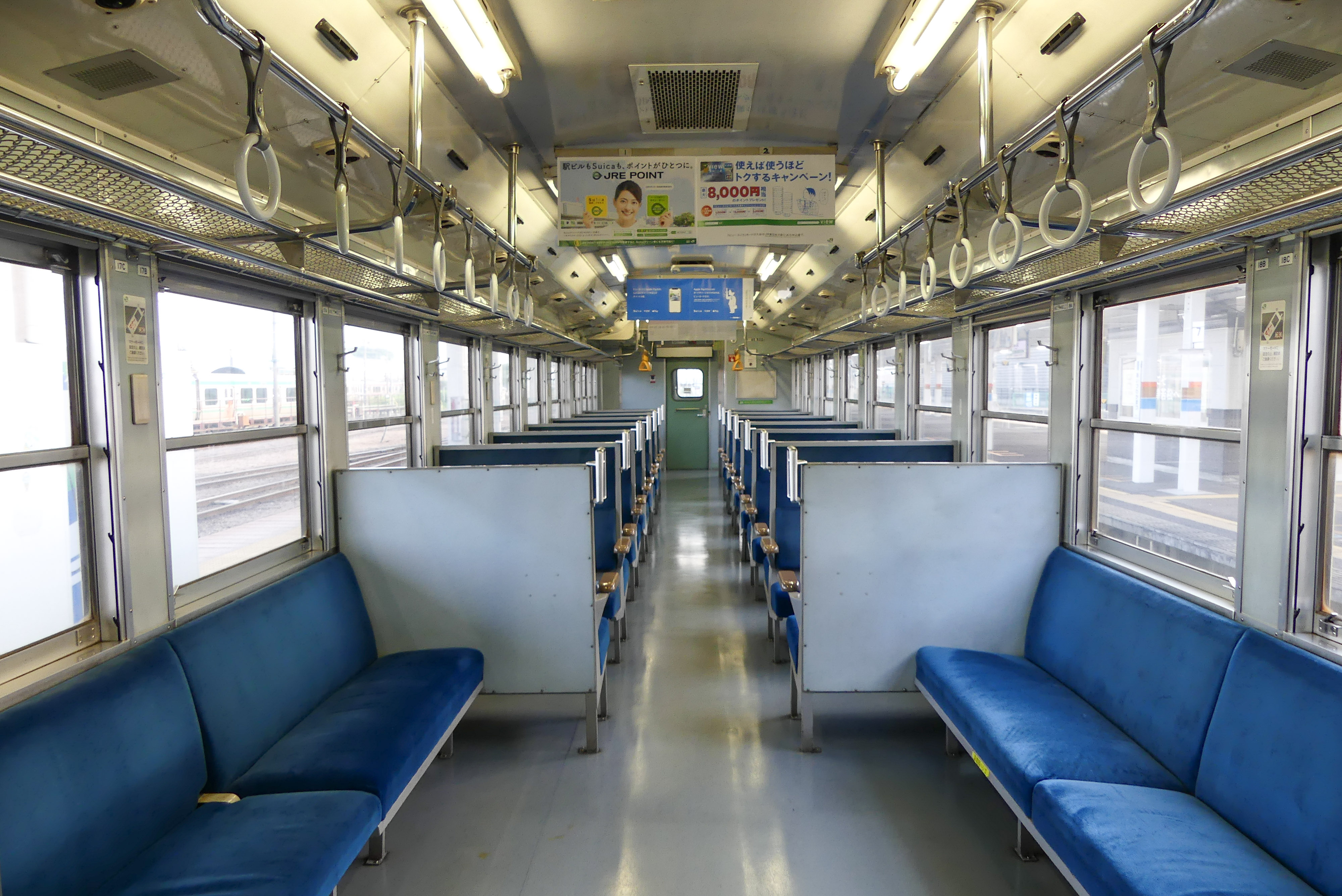
Interior of KiHa 40–502 in May 2018

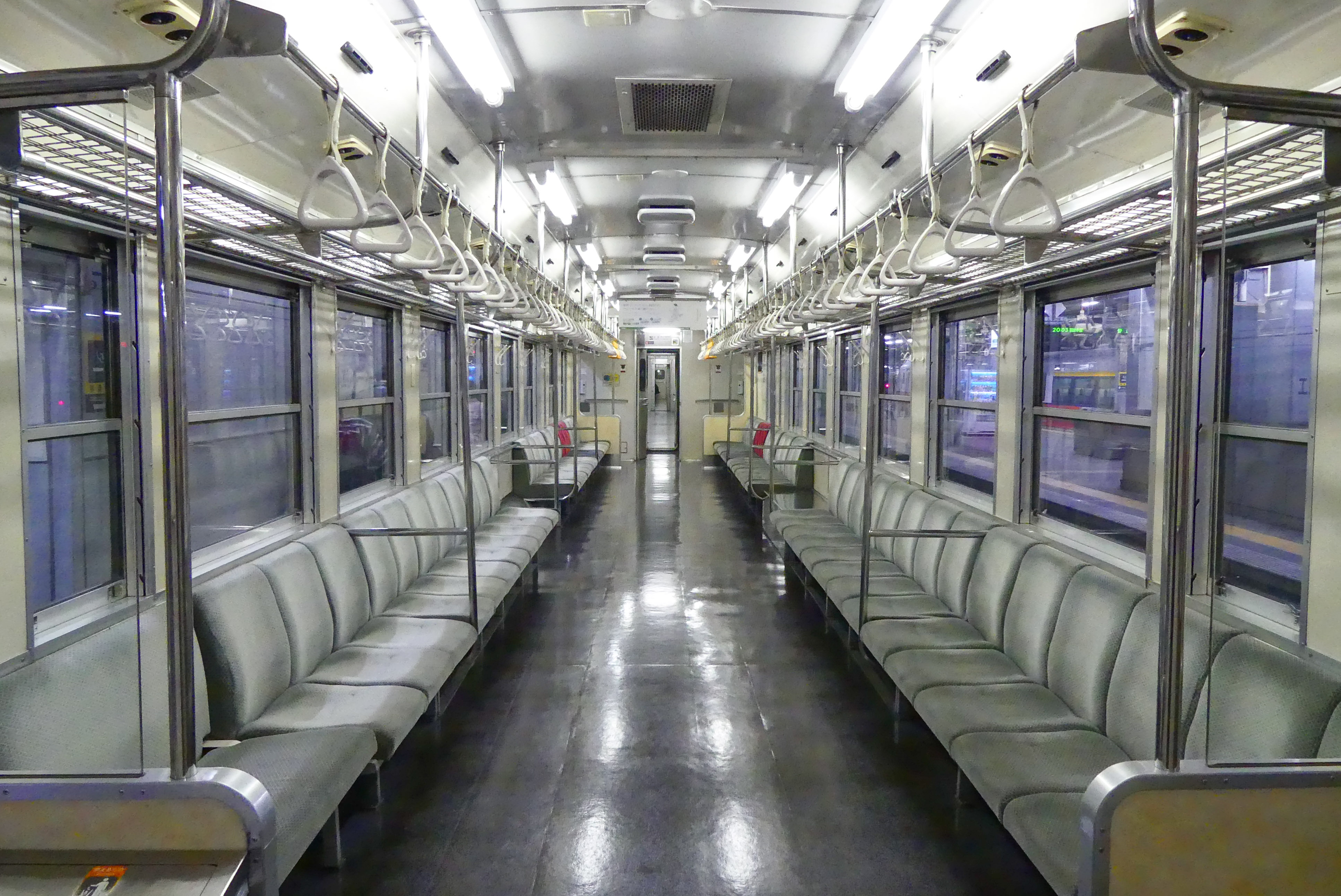
Interior of KiHa 48 in April 2017

=== Joyful Train sets ===
- Furusato (KiHa 48–2500)
- Kirakira Michinoku (KiHa 48)
- Resort Minori (KiHa 48-500)
- Resort Shirakami "Aoike" (KiHa 48)
- Resort Shirakami "Buna" (KiHa 48)
- Resort Shirakami "Kumagera" (KiHa 48)
- Umineko (KiHa 48)
- View Coaster Kazekko (KiHa 48)
- Koshino Shu*Kura (KiHa 40 and 48)
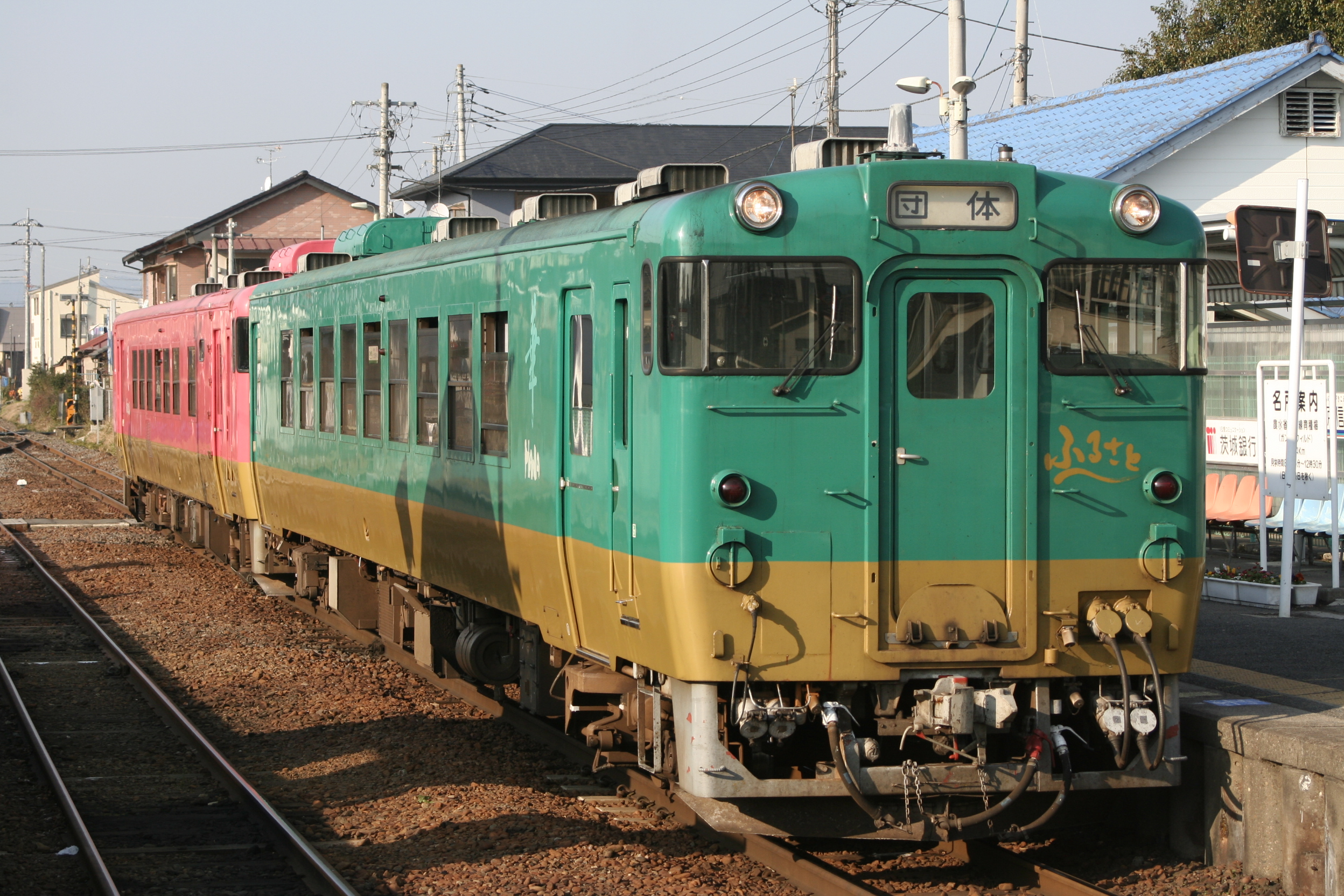
KiHa 48 Furusato in November 2007

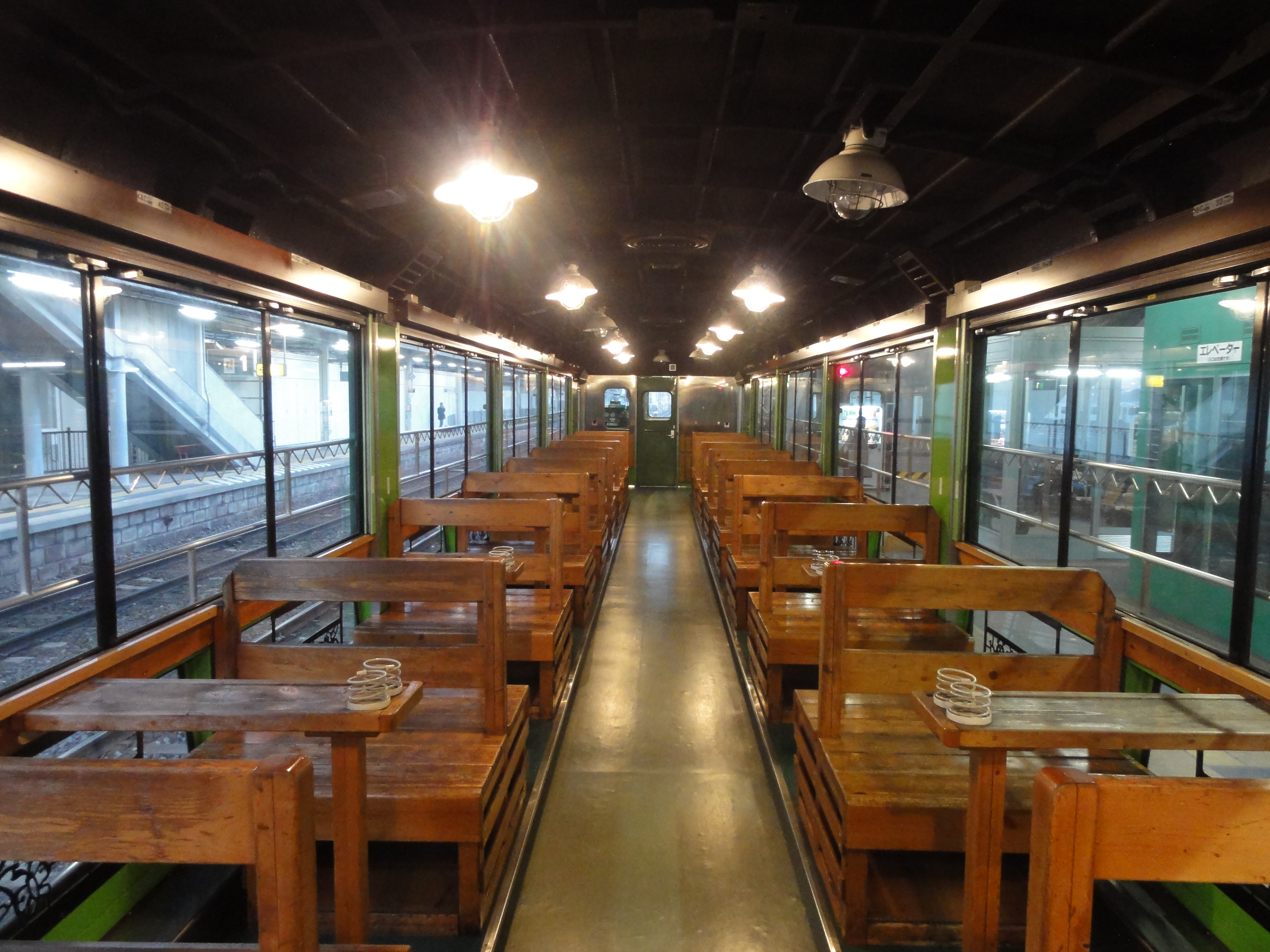
Interior of View Coaster Kazekko

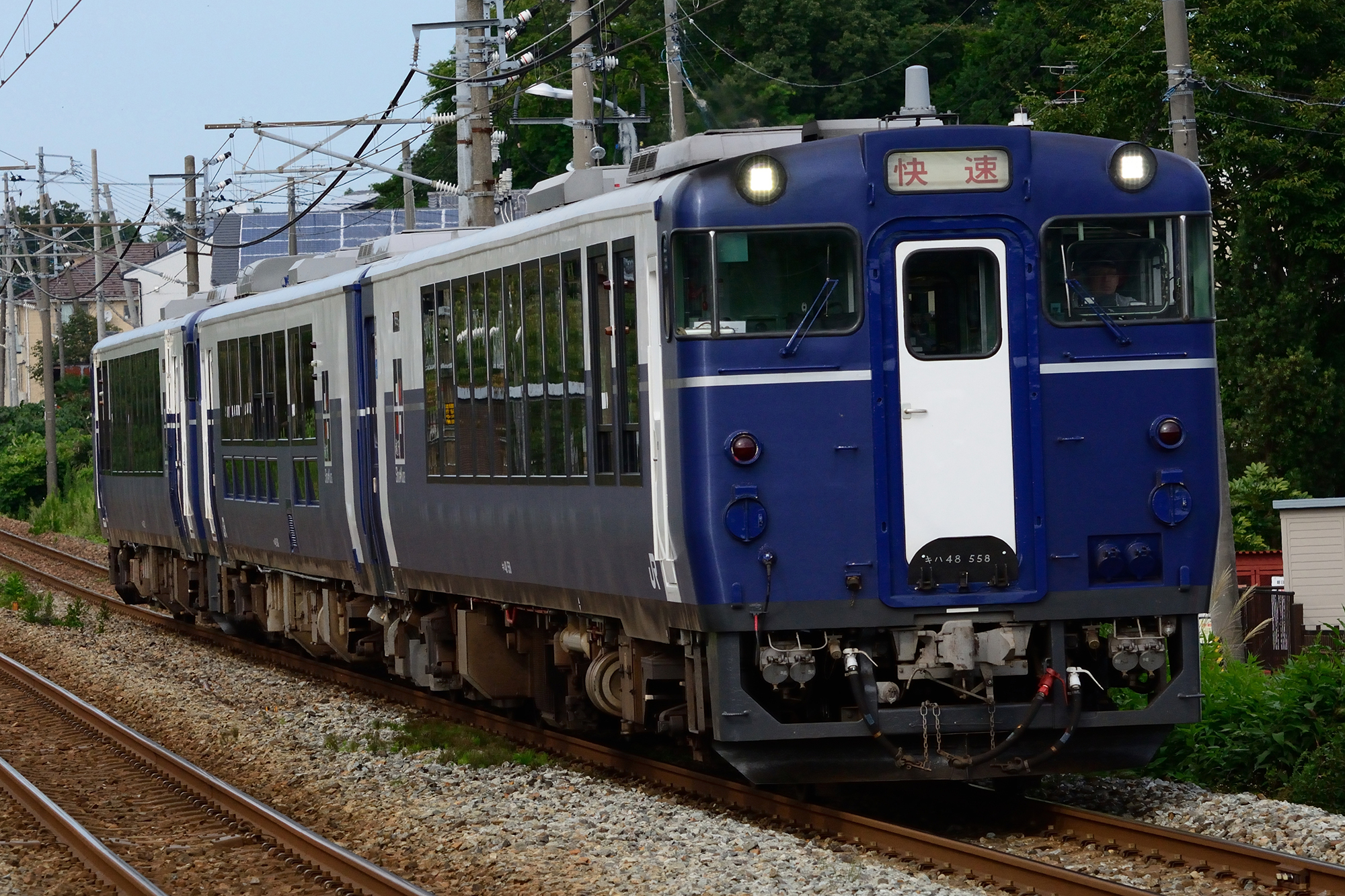
Koshino Shu*Kura on Shin'etsu Main Line

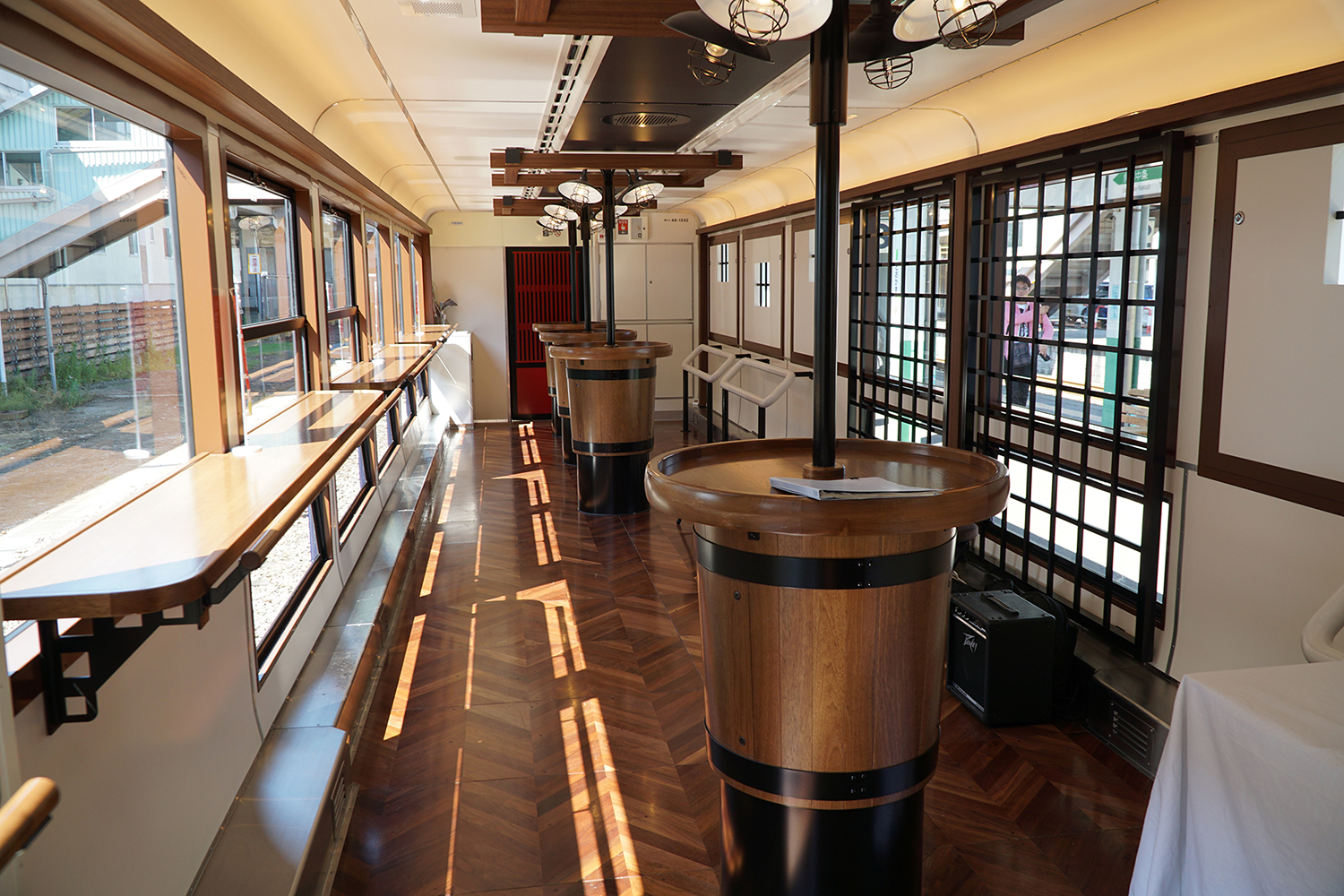
Interior of Koshino Shu*Kura

== JR Central ==
Following the privatization and splitting of JNR in April 1987, JR Central received a total of 59 KiHa 40 series vehicles (14 KiHa 40s, 5 KiHa 47s, and 40 KiHa 48s). By April 2010, JR Central operated 59 KiHa 40 series vehicles, classified as follows.

- KiHa 40 (-3000, -3300, -5000, -5500, -5800, -6000 and -6300)
- KiHa 47 (-5000 and -6000)
- KiHa 48 (-3500, -3800, -5000, -5300, -5500, -5800, -6000, -6300, -6500 and -6800)

These were withdrawn by 2016.

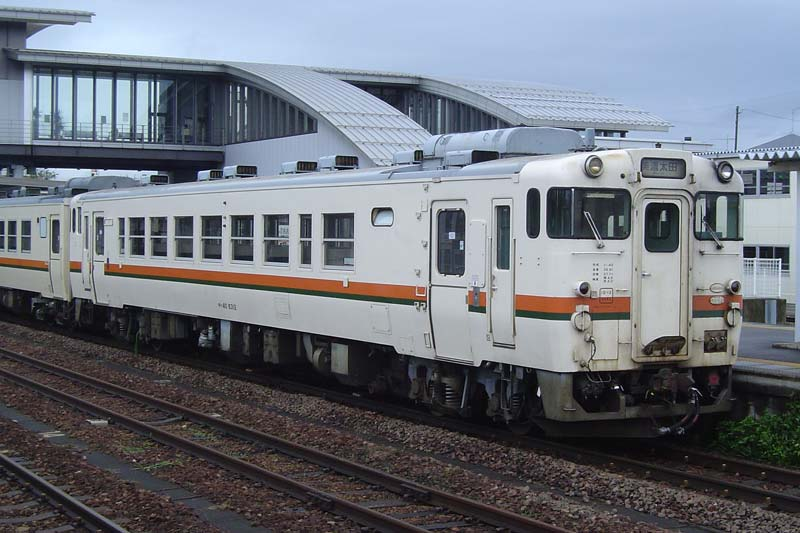
KiHa 40 6300 in September 2004

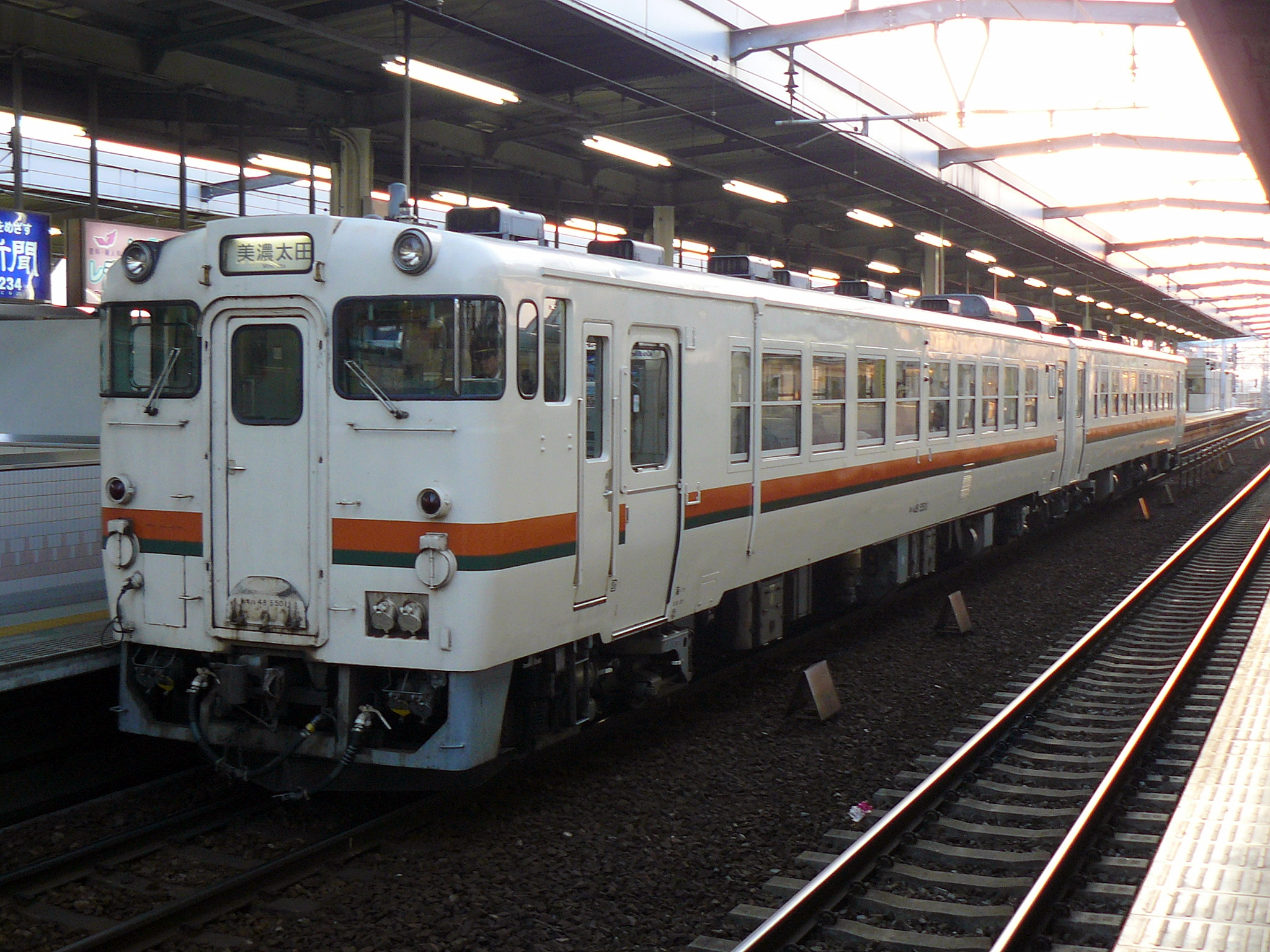
KiHa 48 5500 in March 2008

== JR West ==
Following the privatization and splitting of JNR in April 1987, JR-West received a total of 257 KiHa 40 series vehicles (63 KiHa 40s, 189 KiHa 47s, and 5 KiHa 48s). As of 1 April 2010, JR-West operates 255 KiHa 40 series vehicles, classified as follows.

- KiHa 40-3000
- KiHa 41-2000
- KiHa 47 (-2000 and -2500)
- KiHa 48 (-3000 and -3500)
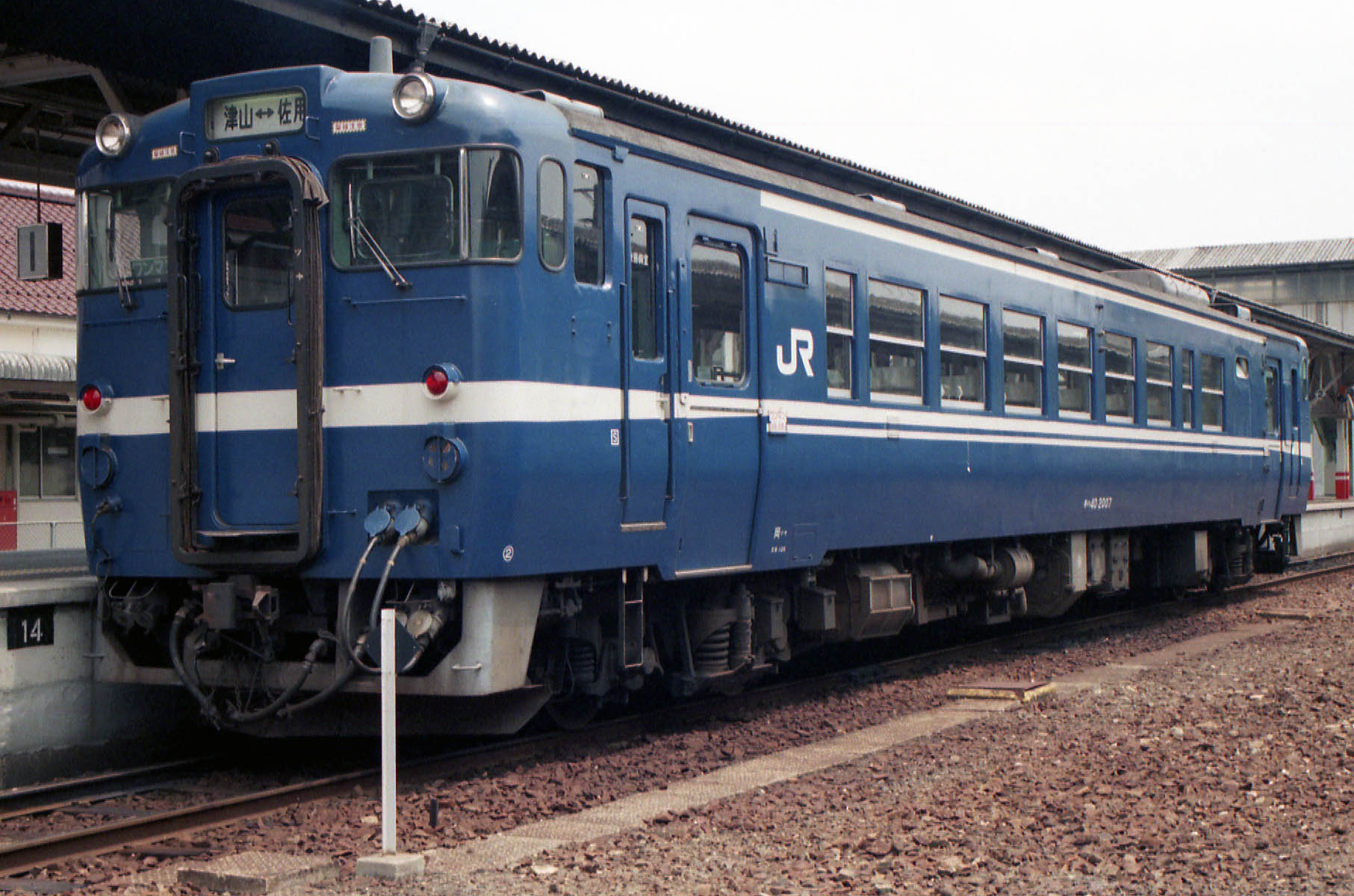
KiHa 40 2007 in 1997

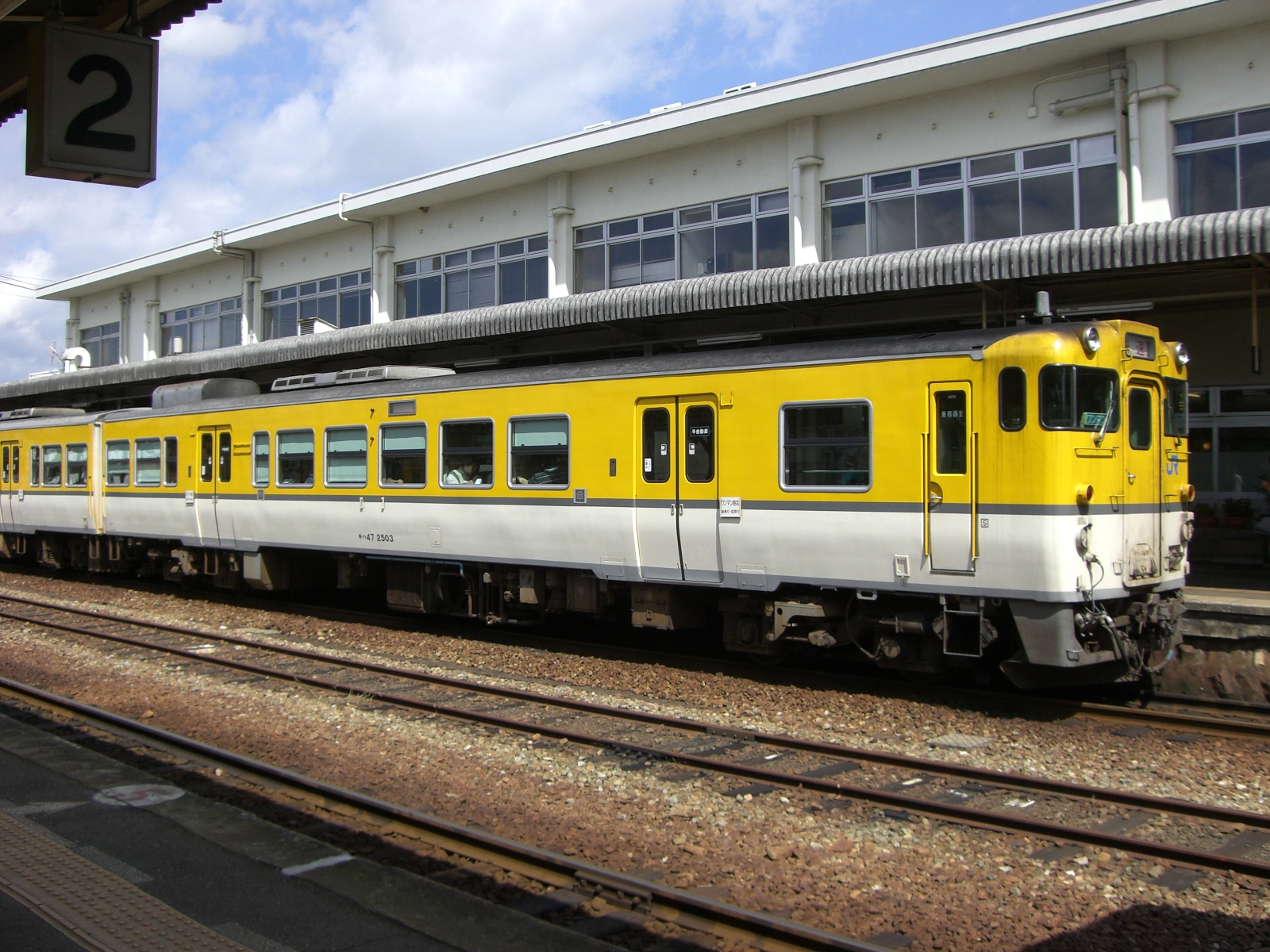
KiHa 47 2503 in August 2007

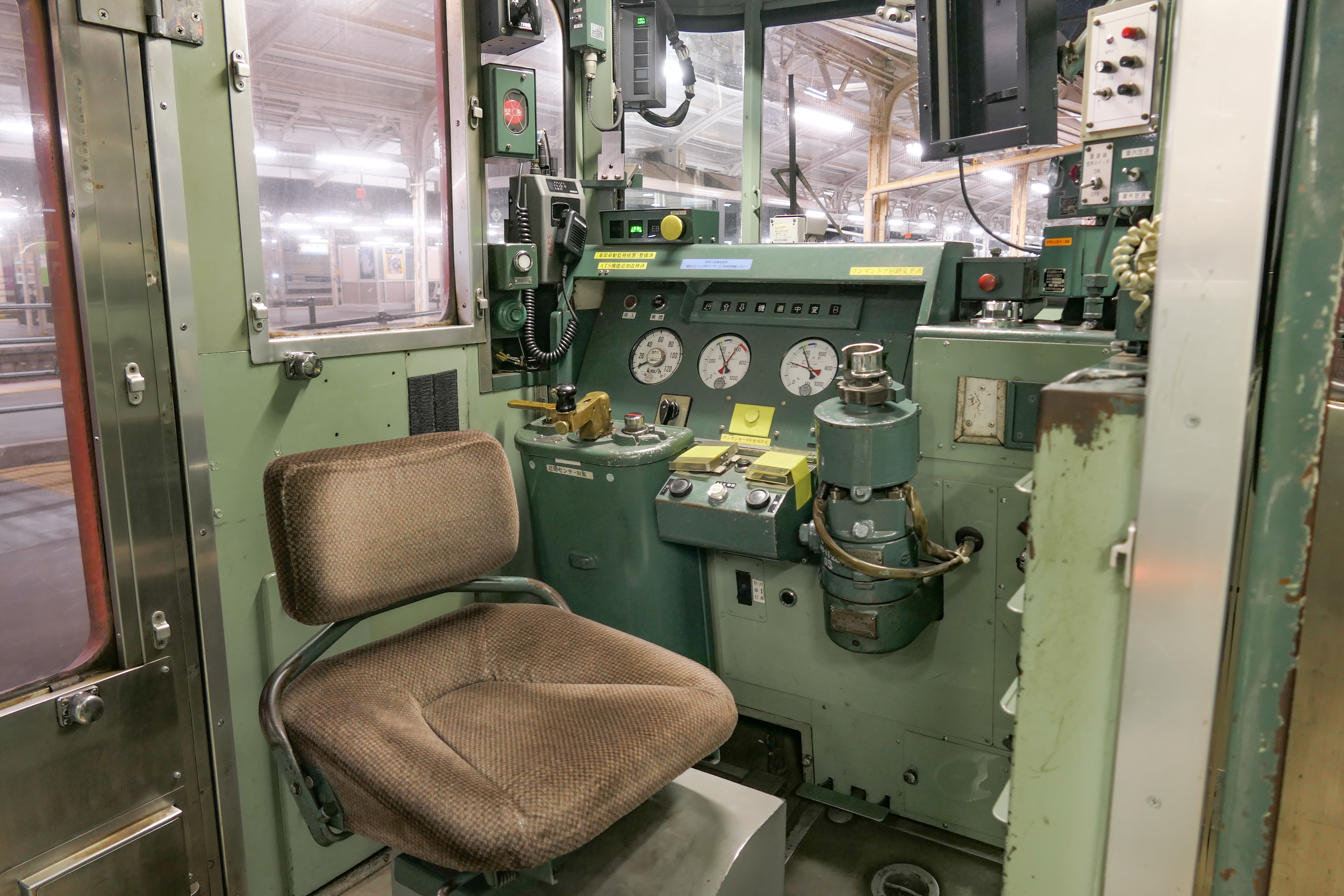
Driver's cab of KiHa 47 1061 in December 2021

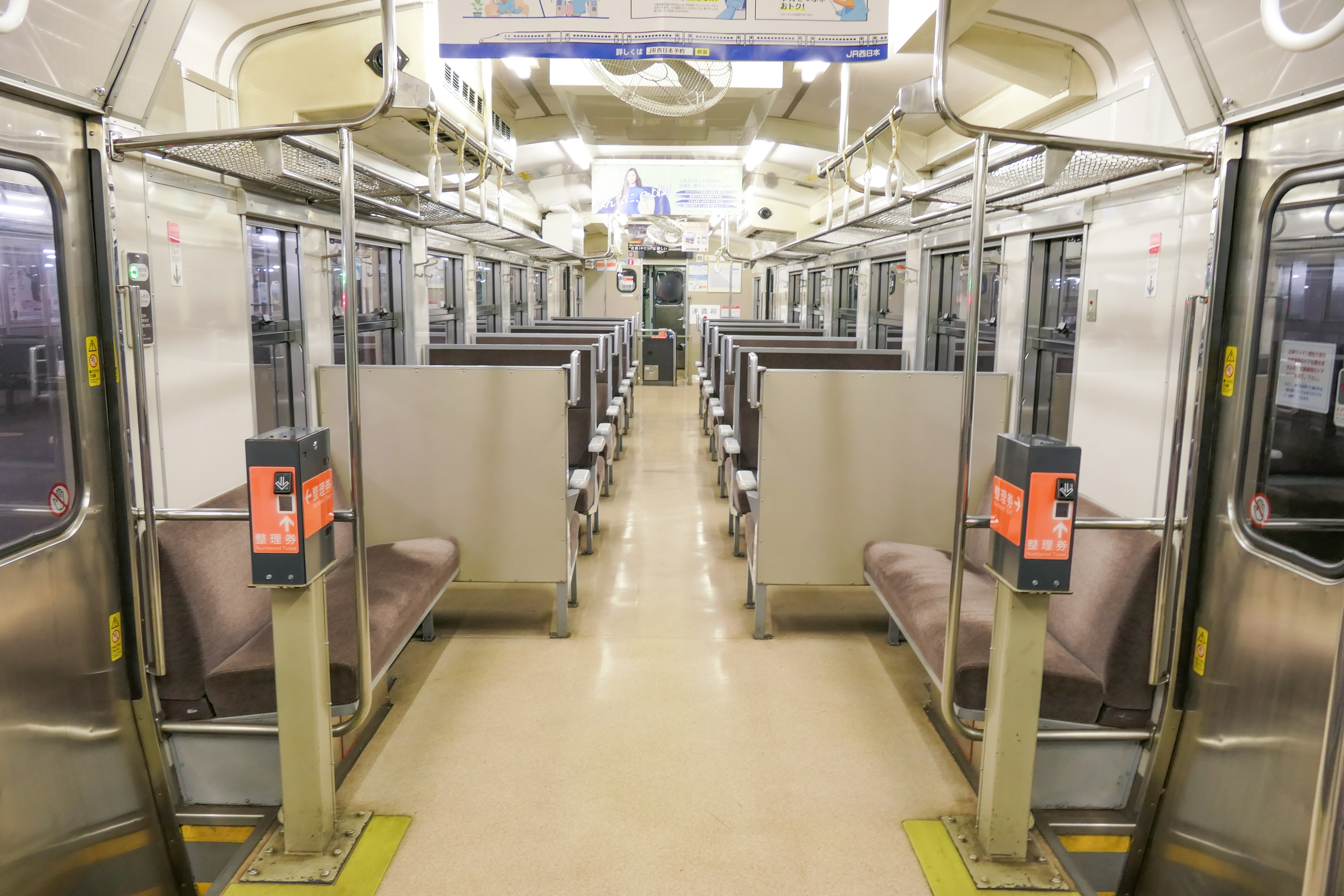
Interior of KiHa 47 1061 in December 2021

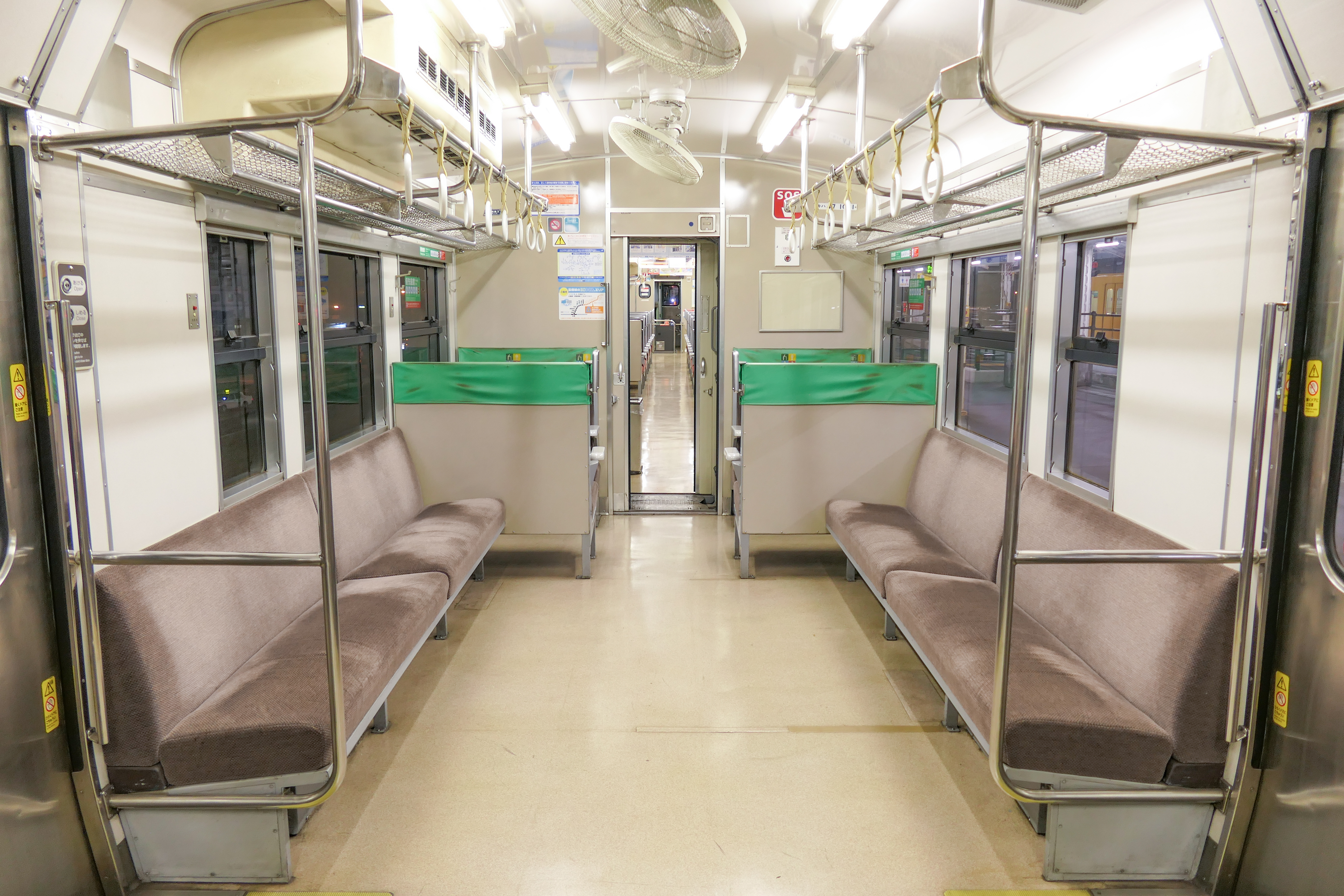
Priority seating of KiHa 47 1061 in December 2021

=== Joyful Train sets ===
- Misuzu Shiosai (KiHa 47)
- Setouchi Marine View (KiHa 47) (Until December 12 2019 replaced by etSETOra)
- Belles Montagnes et Mer (KiHa 40)
- Hanayome Noren (KiHa 48)
- Tenkū no shiro Takeda-jō ato (KiHa 40)
- etSETOra (KiHa47)
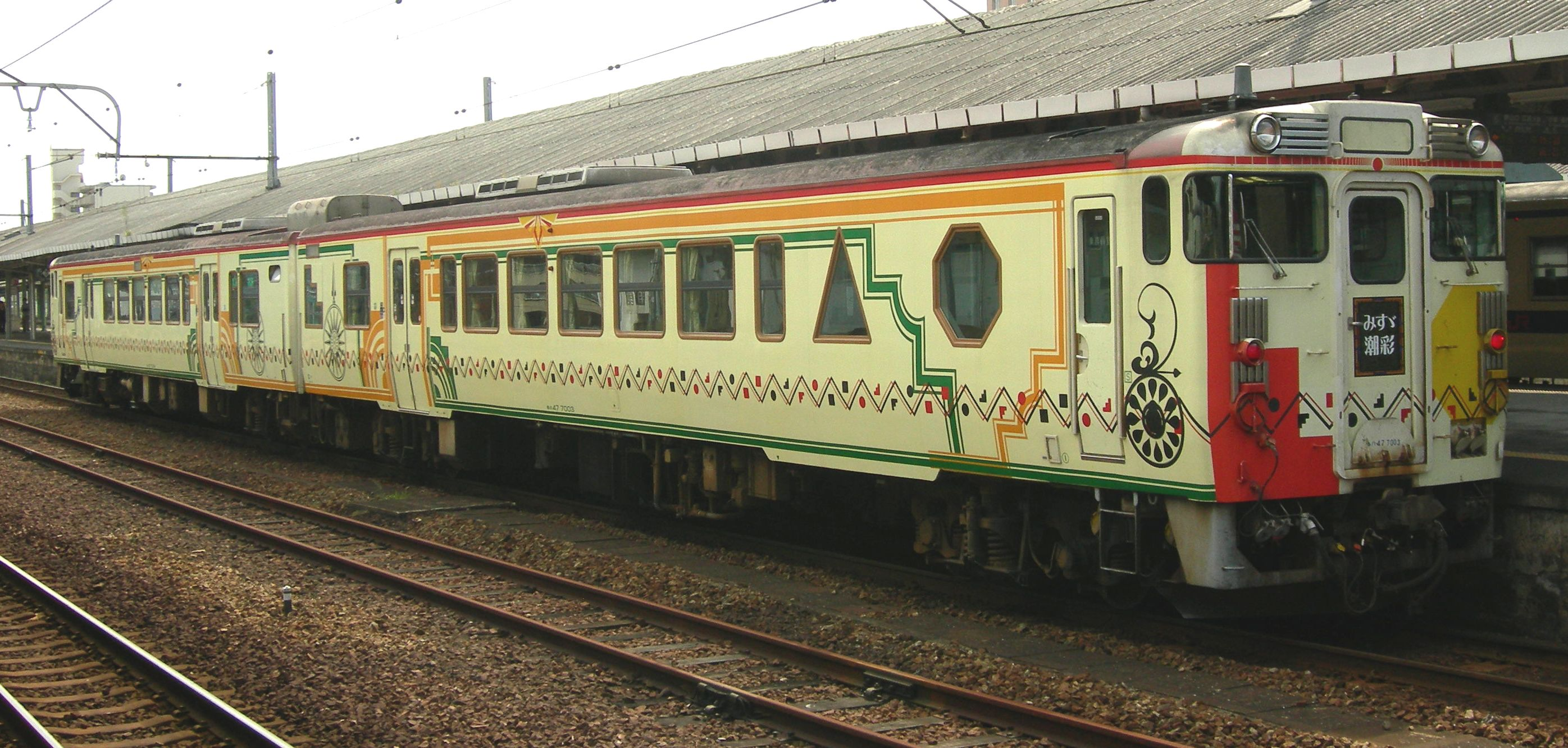
Misuzu Shiosai in July 2011

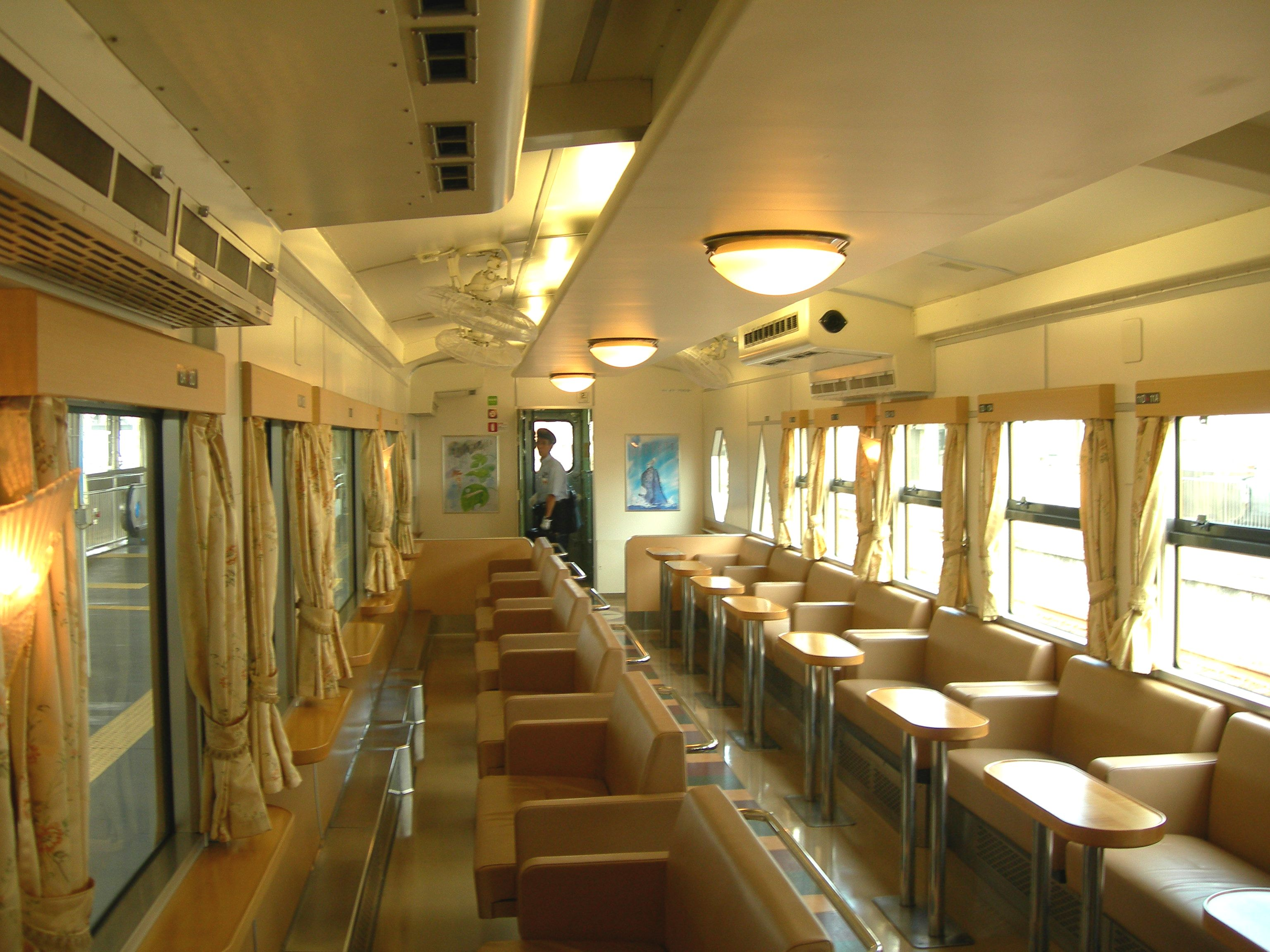
Interior of Misuzu Shiosai

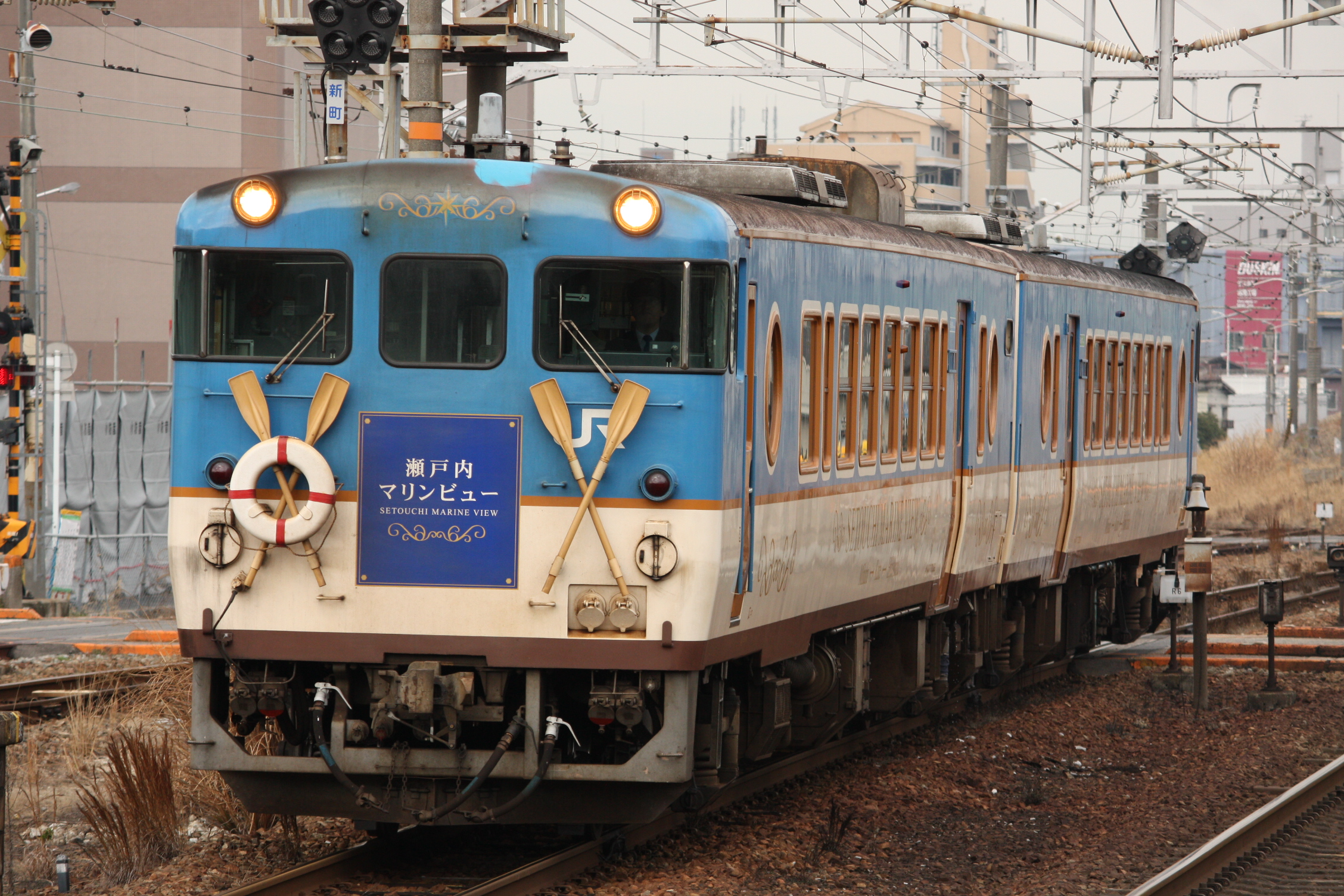
Setouchi Marine View in March 2011

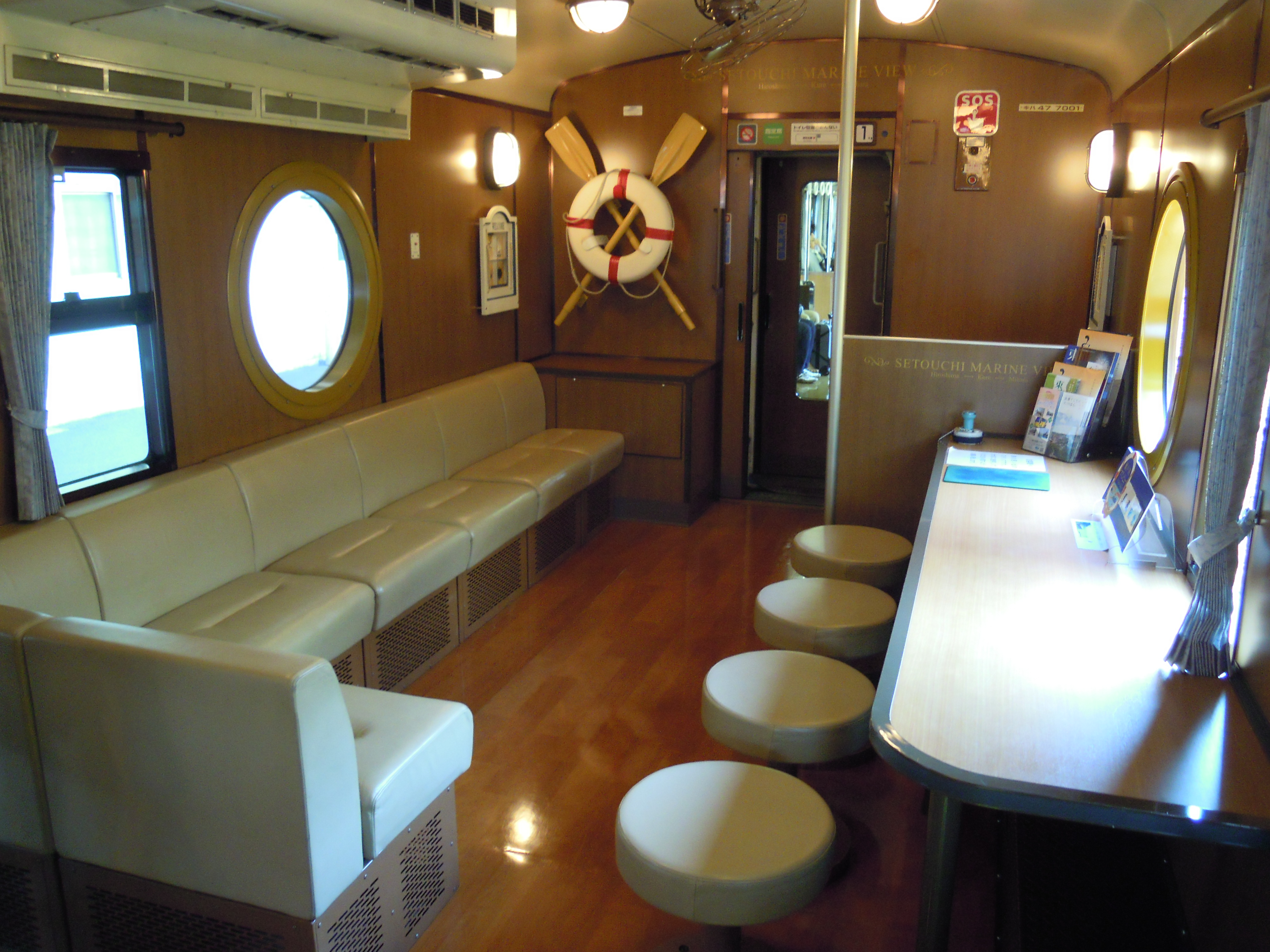
Interior of Setouchi Marine View in May 2016

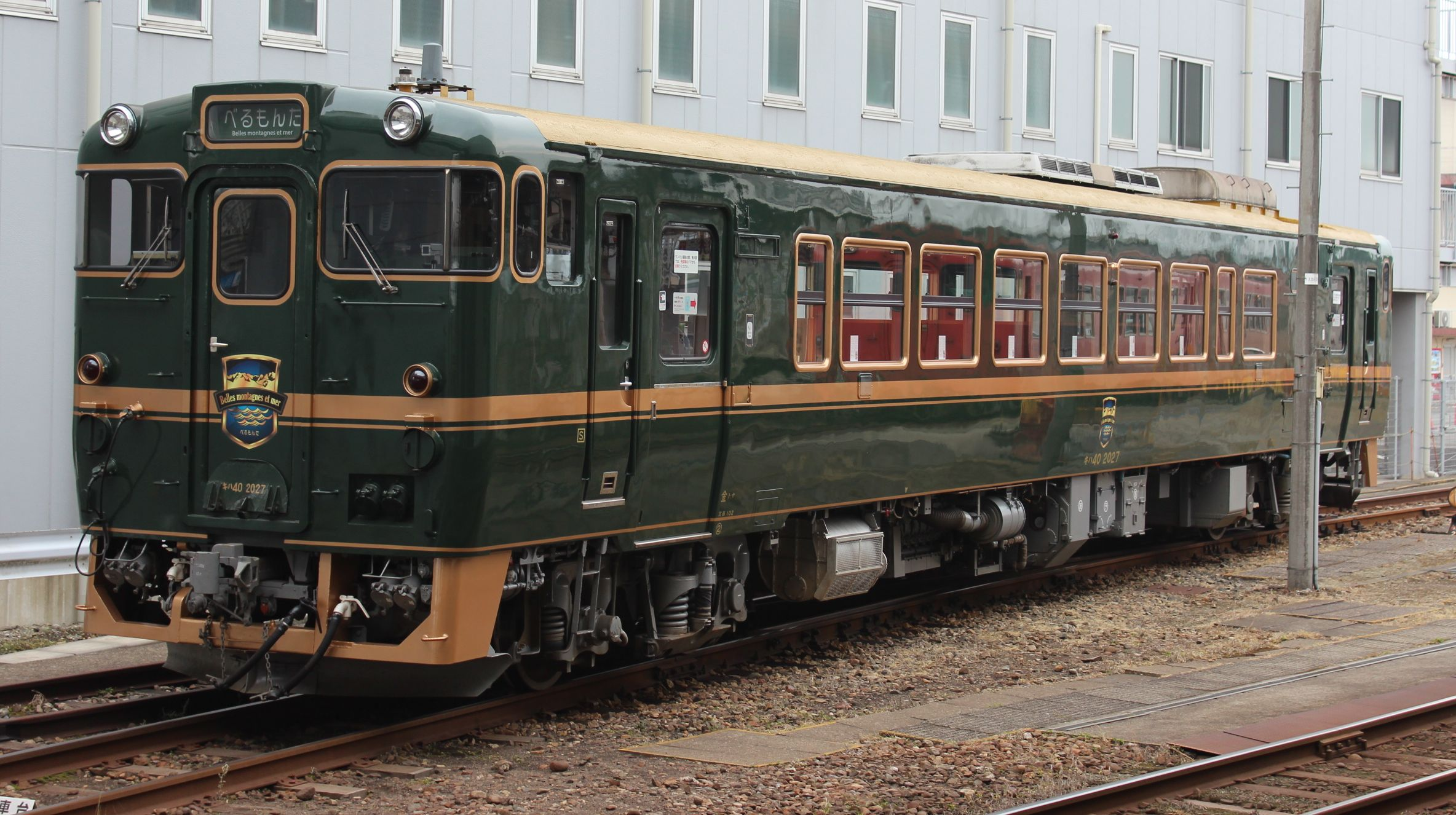
Belles Montagnes et Mer

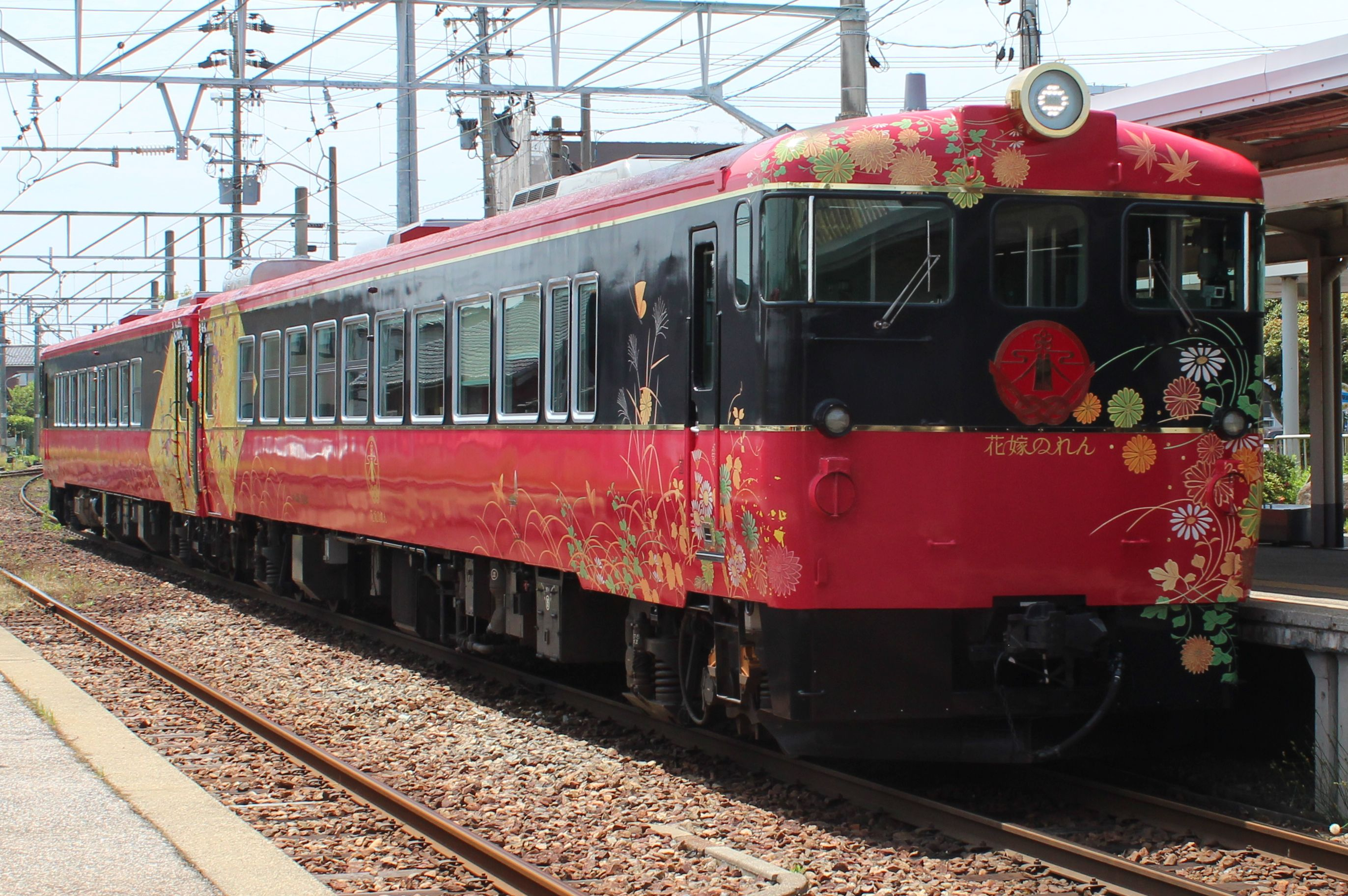
Hanayome Noren in May 2016

== JR Shikoku ==
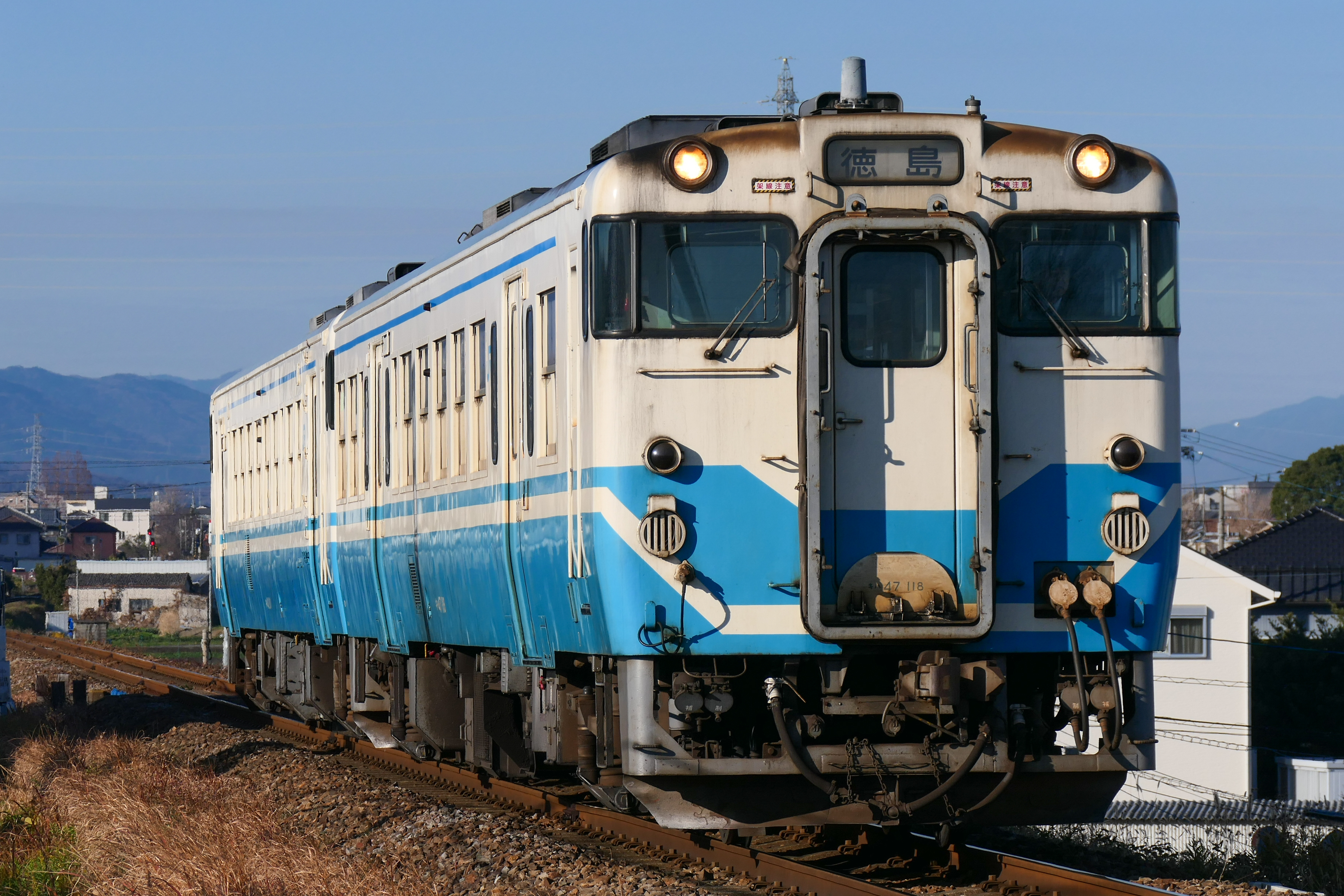
KiHa 47-118, January 2020

Following the privatization and splitting of JNR in April 1987, JR Shikoku received a total of 53 KiHa 40 series vehicles (11 KiHa 40s and 42 KiHa 47s). As of 1 April 2010, JR Shikoku operates 43 KiHa 40 series vehicles, classified as follows.

- KiHa 40-2000
- KiHa 47 (-0, -500, -1000, -1500)

=== Joyful Train sets ===
- Iyonada Monogatari (KiHa 47)
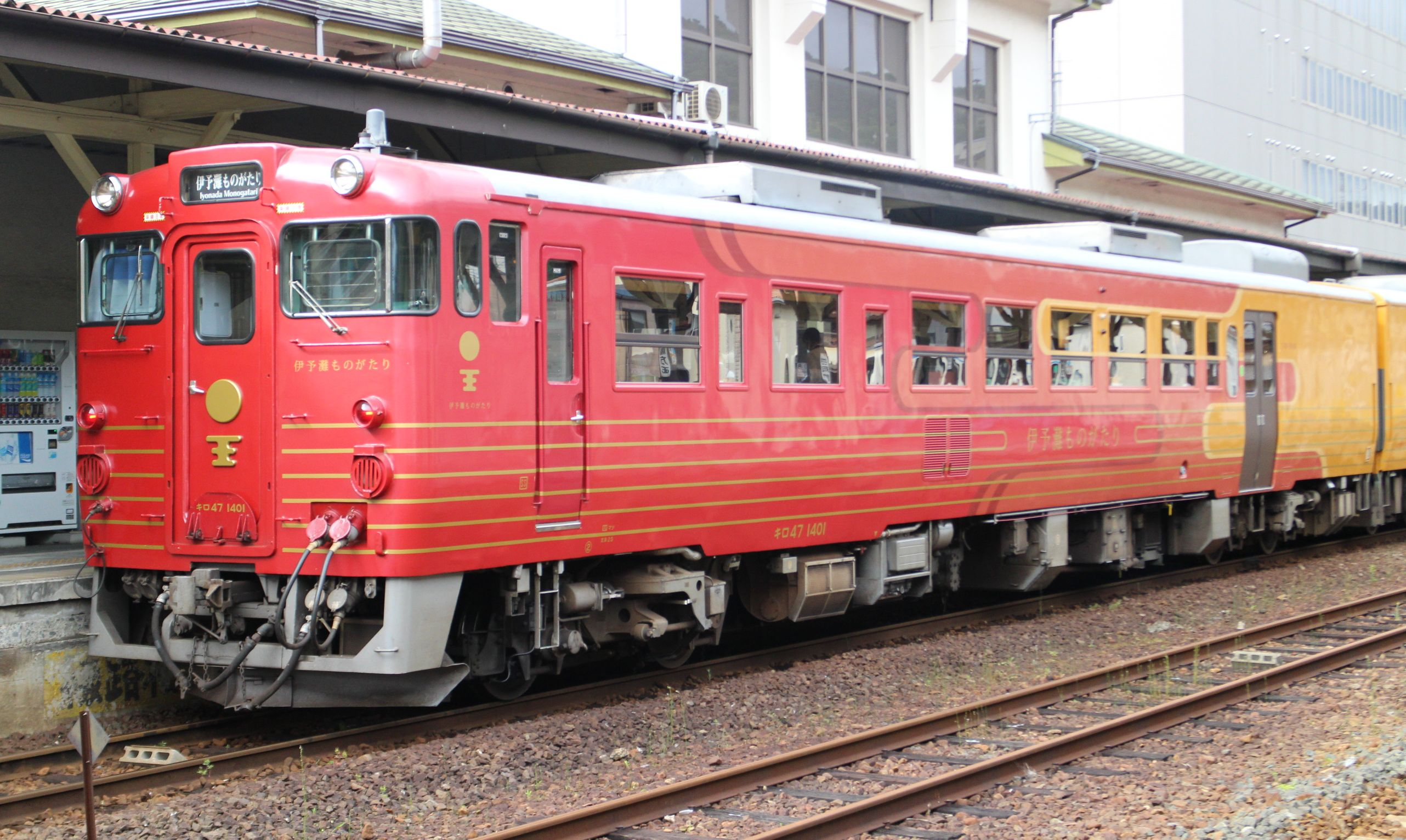
Iyonada Monogatari in May 2017

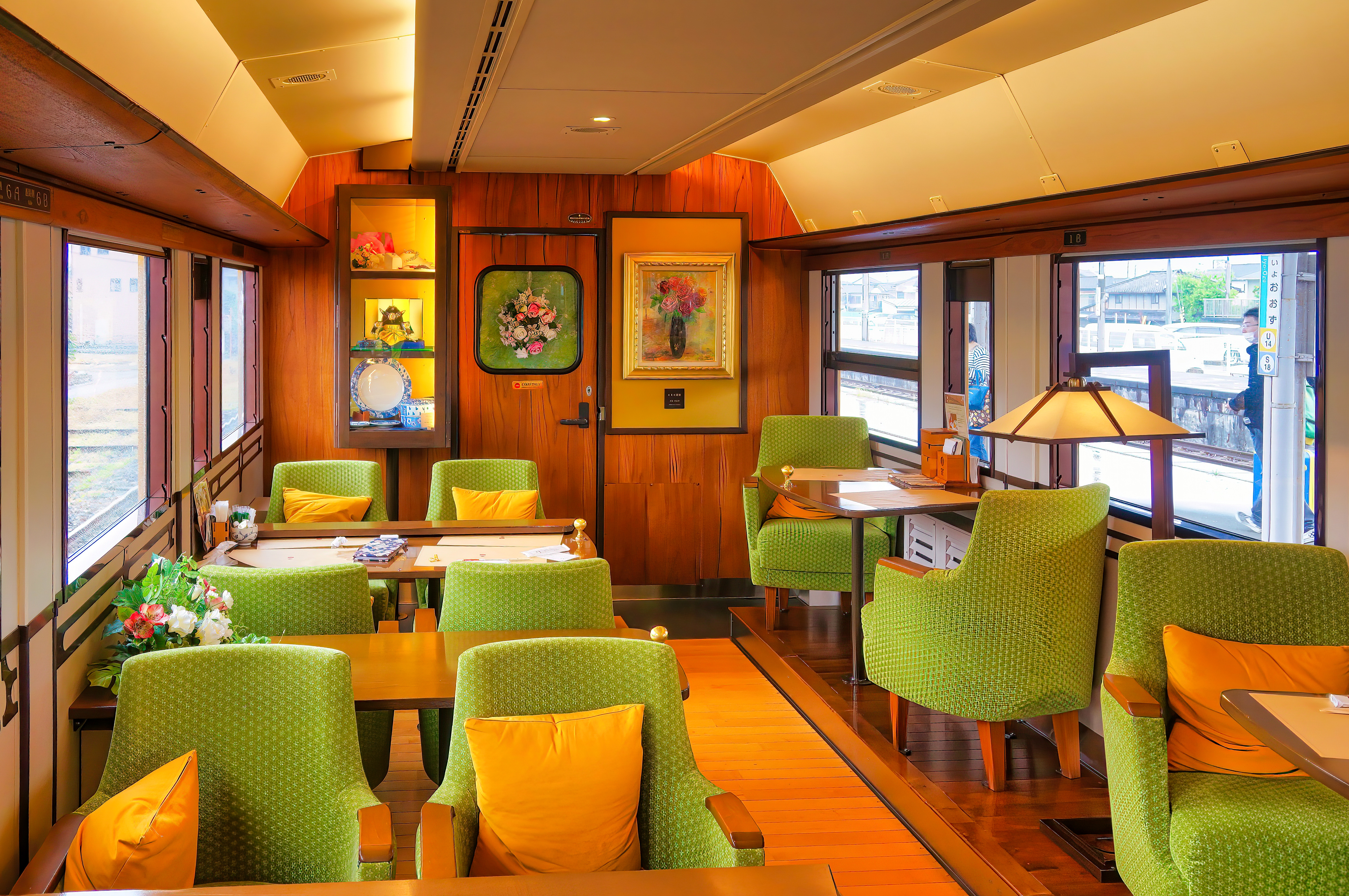
Interior of Iyonada Monogatari

== JR Kyushu ==
Following the privatization and splitting of JNR in April 1987, JR Kyushu received a total of 142 KiHa 40 series vehicles (36 KiHa 40s and 106 KiHa 47s). As of 1 April 2010, JR Kyushu operates 140 KiHa 40 series vehicles, classified as follows.

- KiHa 40 (-7000 and -8000)
- KiHa 47 (-3500, -4500, -5000, -6000, -8000, -8500, -9000 and -9500)
- KiHa 140-2000
- KiHa 147 (-0 and -1000)
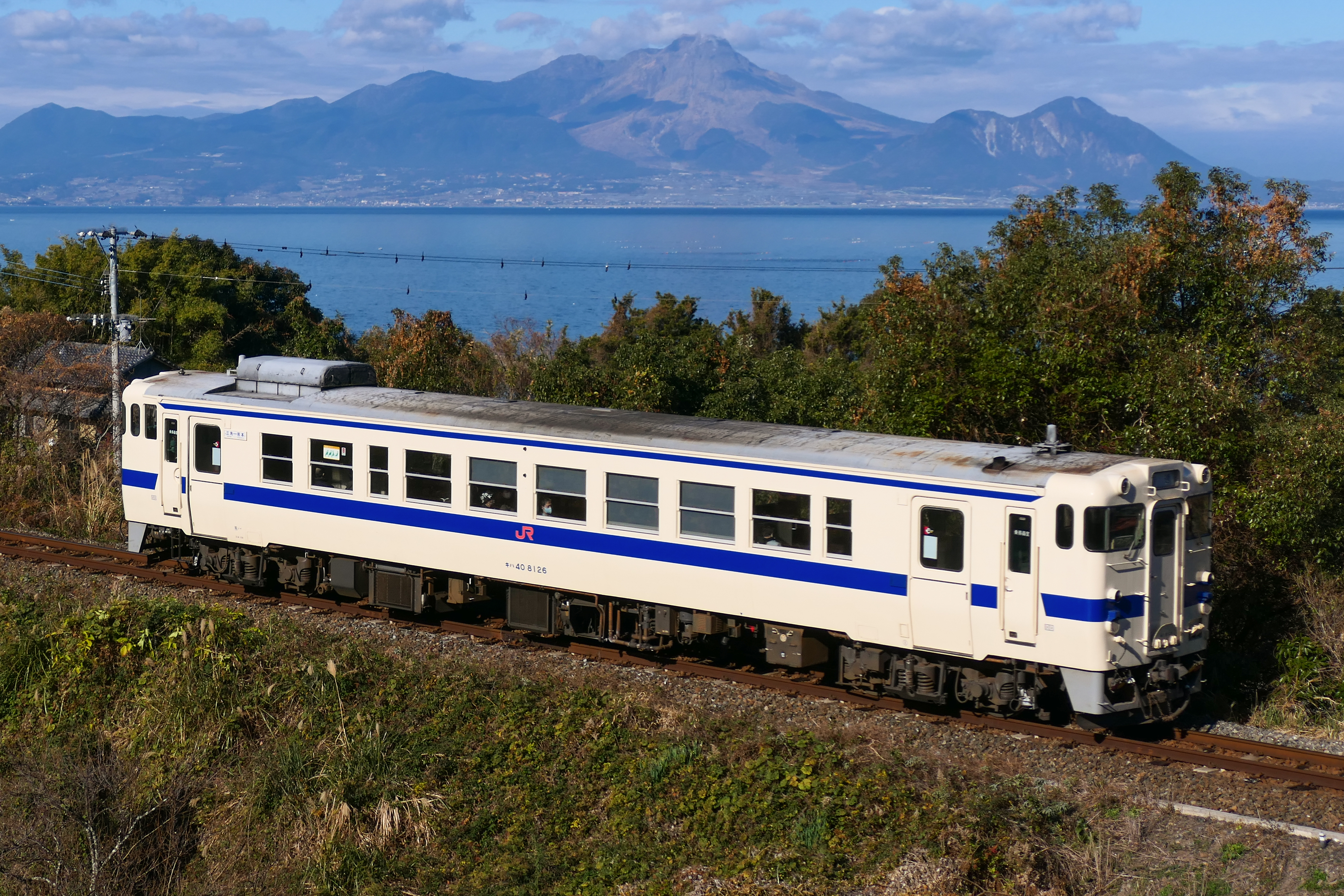
KiHa 40 8126 in January 2022

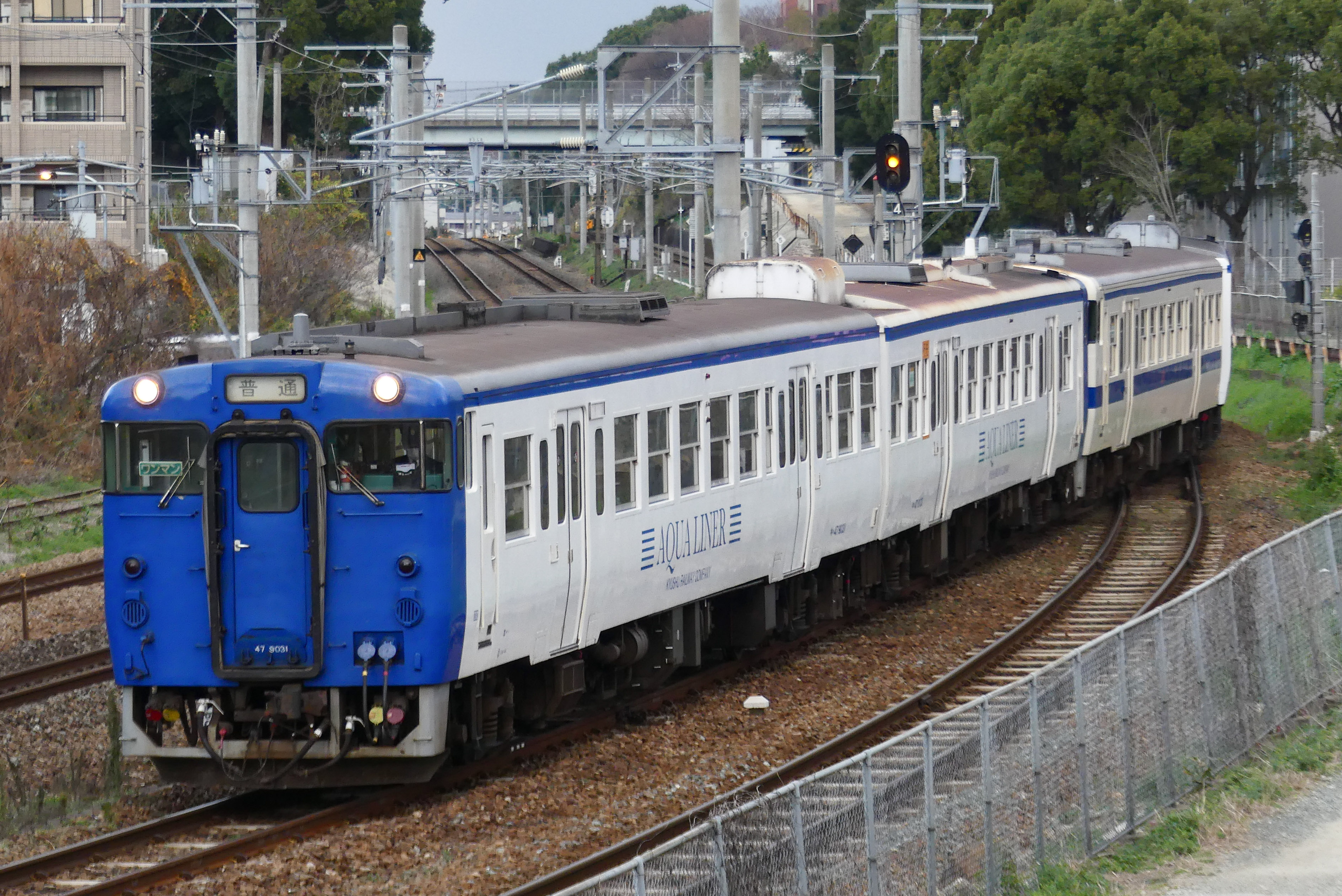
KiHa 47 9031 in August 2007, AQUA LINER livery on Kashii Line

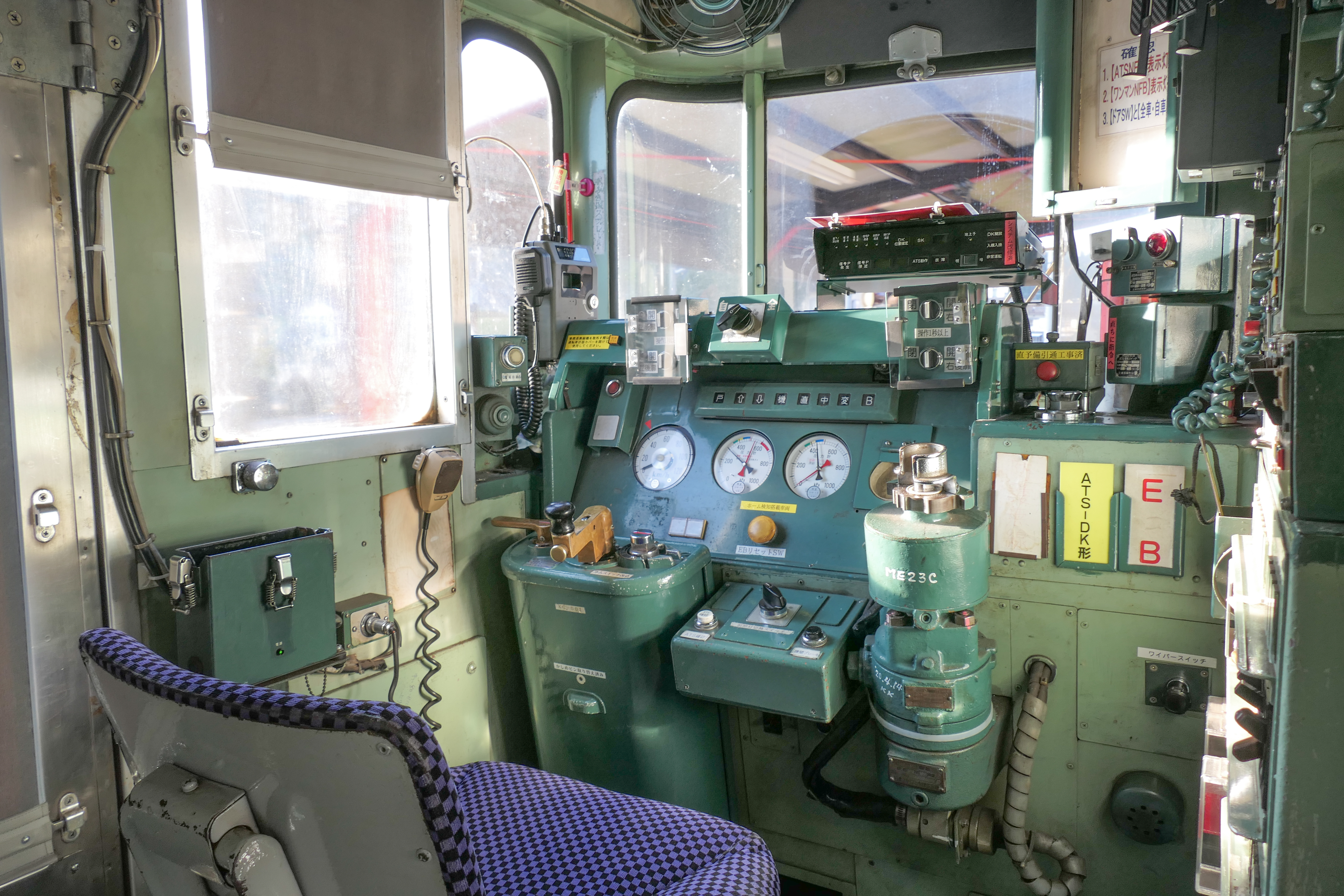
Driver's cab of KiHa 40 8101 in January 2022

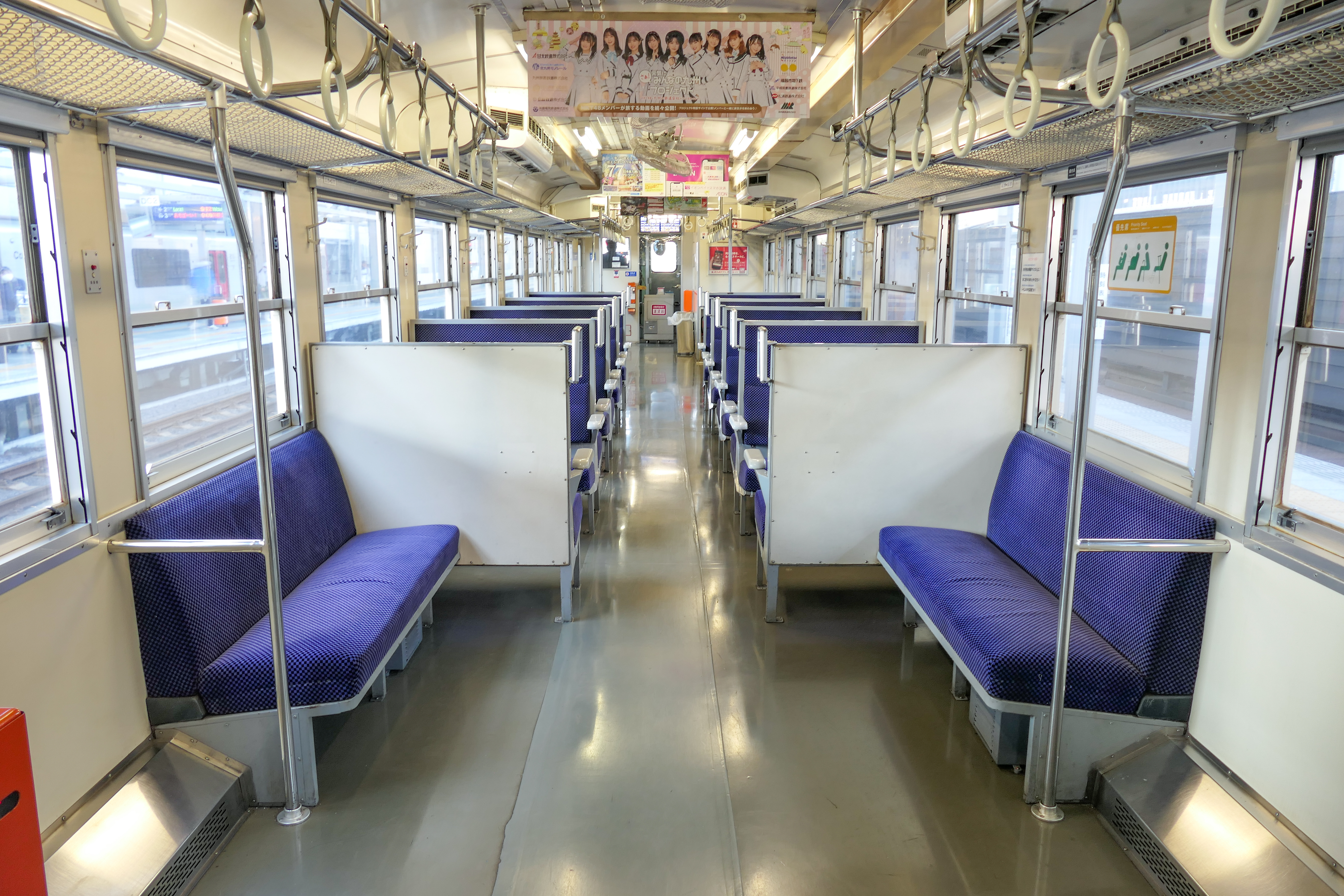
Interior of KiHa 40 8126 in January 2022

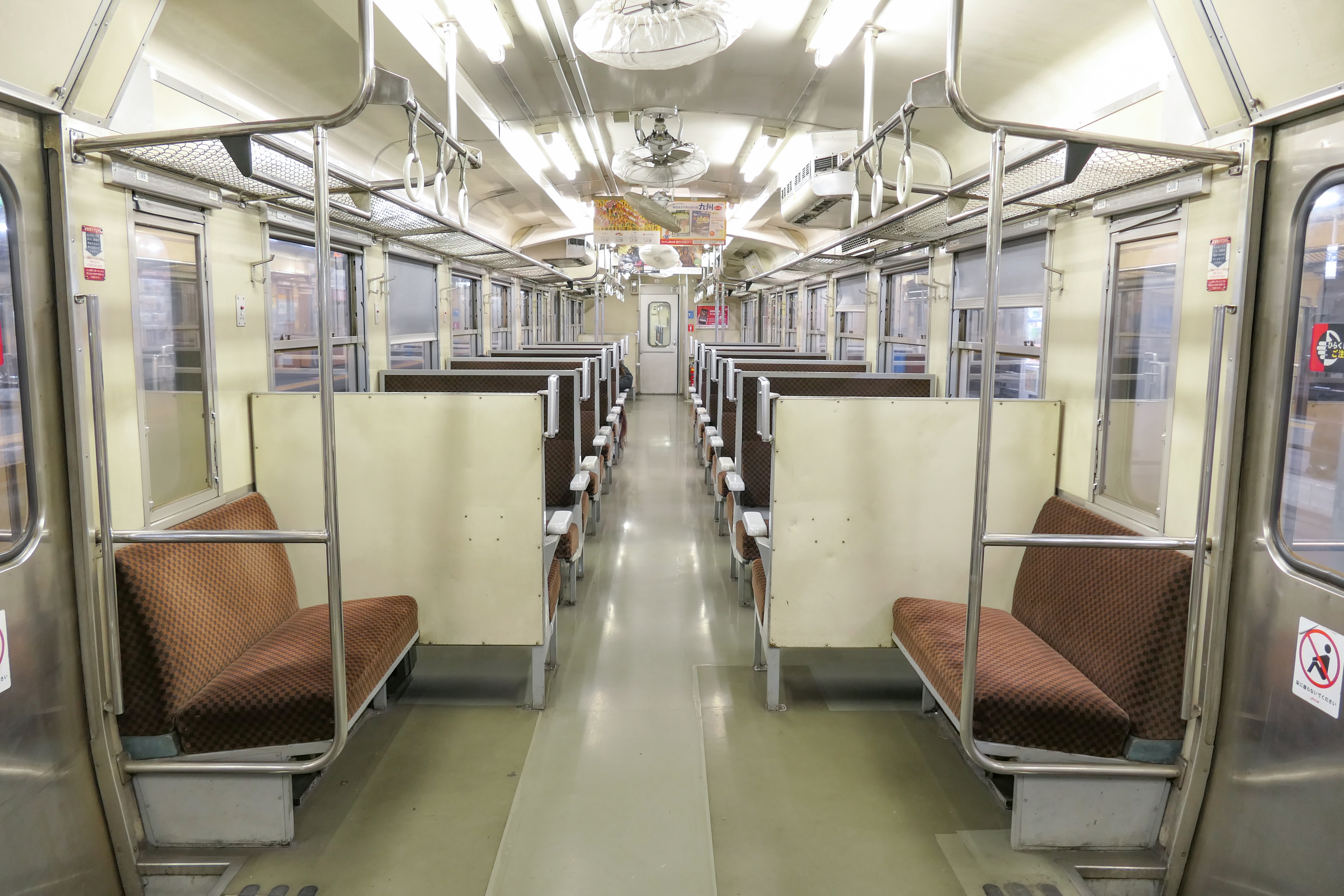
Interior of KiHa 147 50 in December 2021

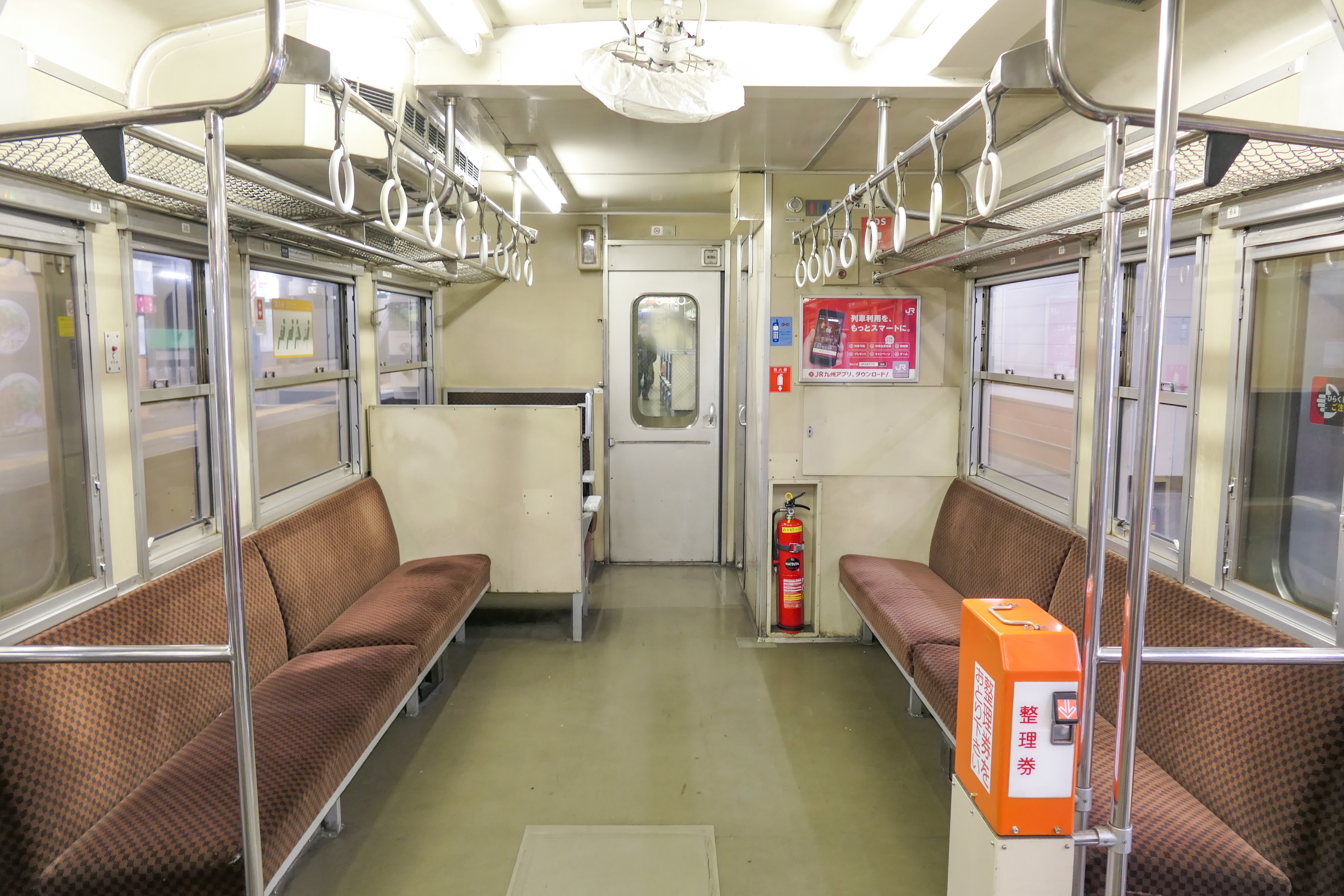
Priority seating of KiHa 147 50 in December 2021

=== Joyful Train sets ===
- Hayato no Kaze (KiHa 47/147)
- Ibusuki no Tamatebako (KiHa 47/140)
- Aru Ressha (KiRoShi 47)
- Two Stars 4047 (KiHa 47/147)
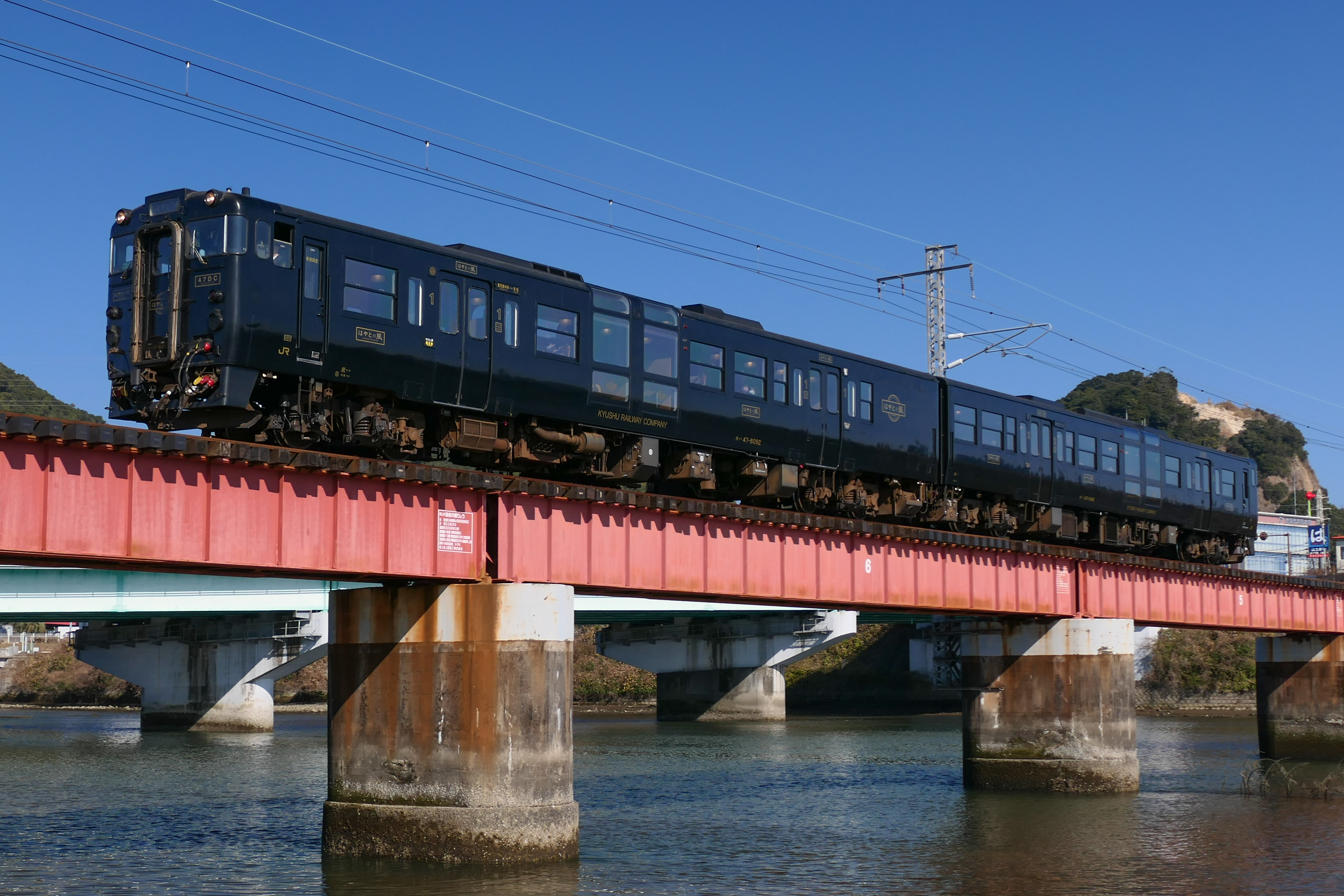
Hayato no Kaze in January 2022

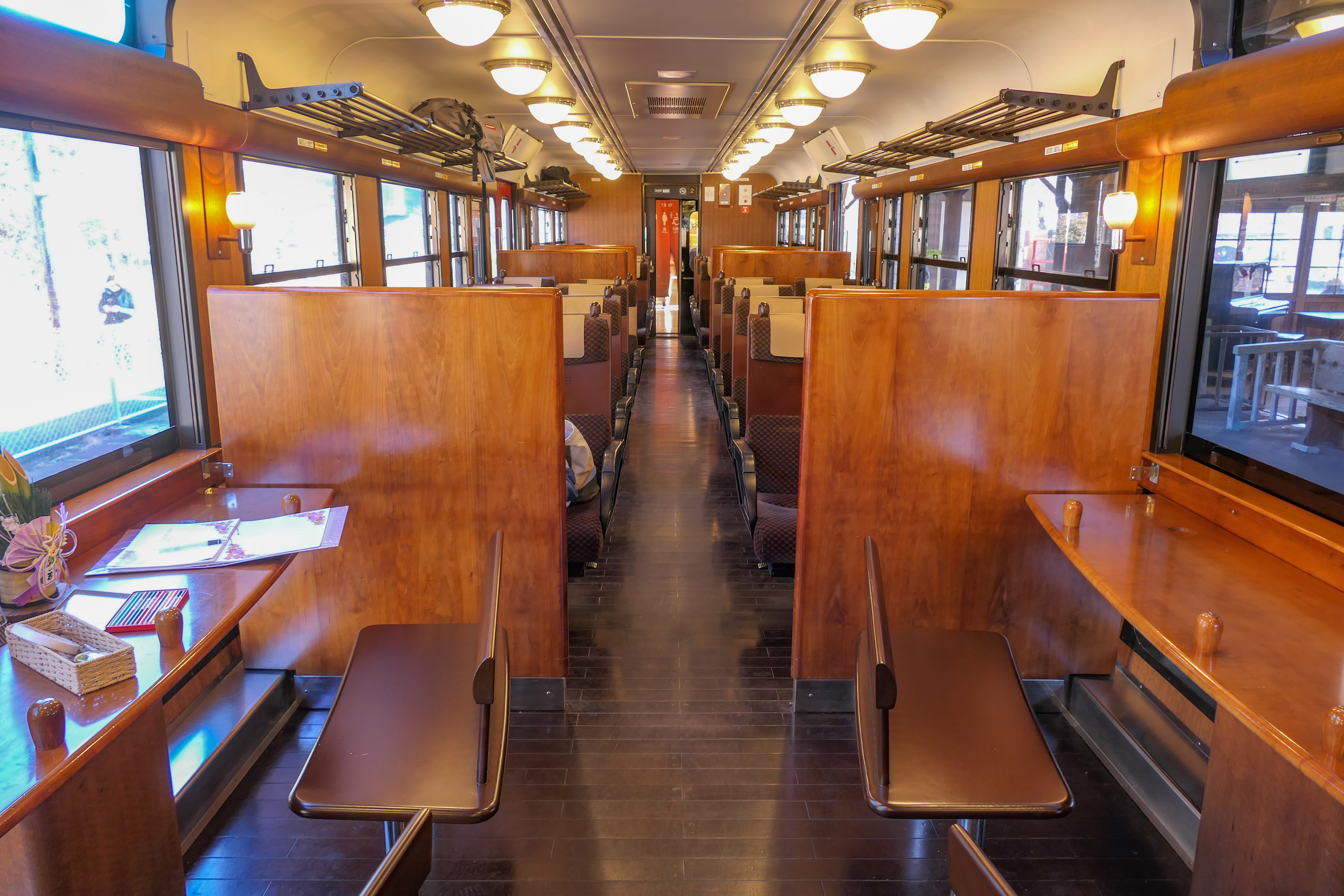
Interior of Hayato no Kaze

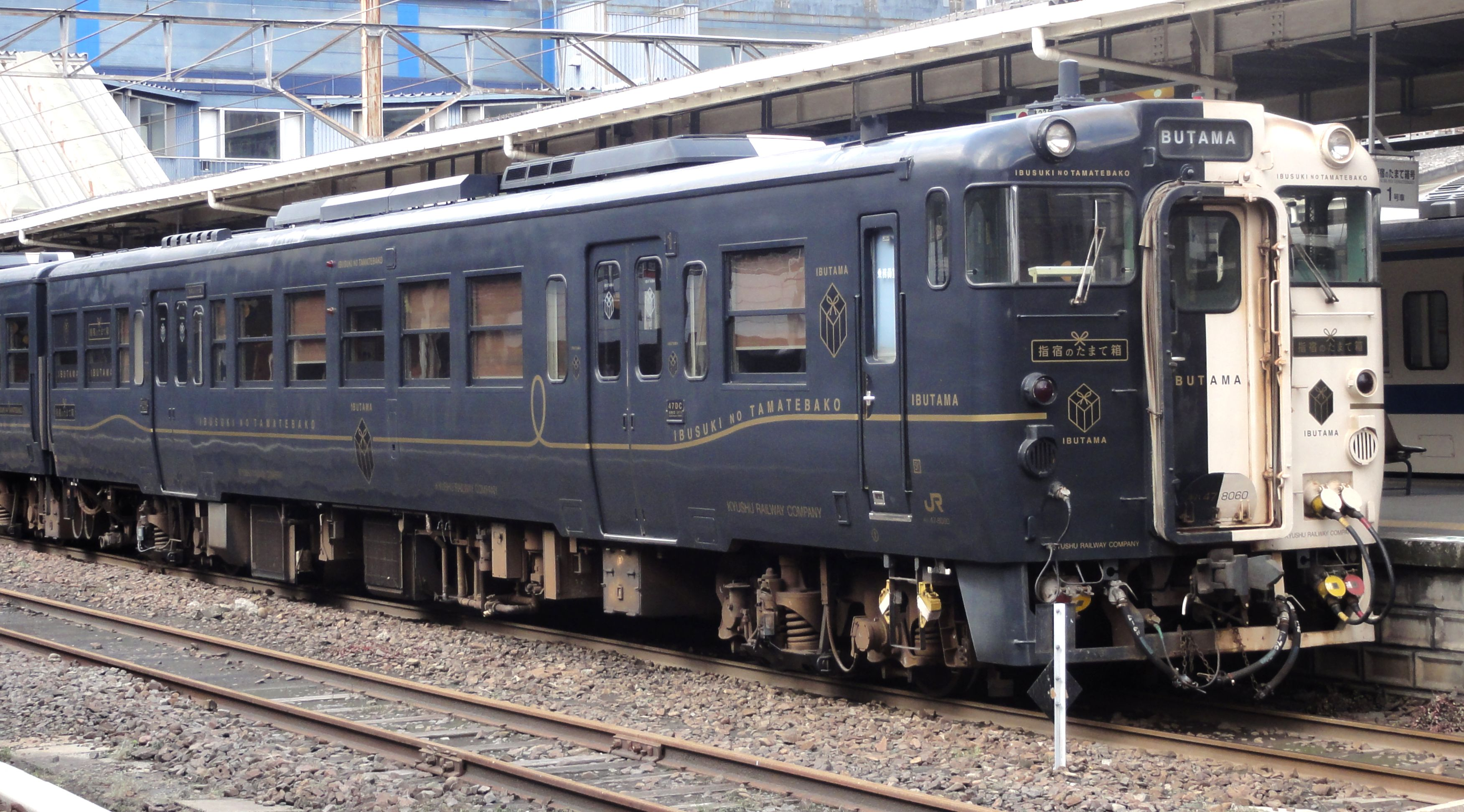
Ibusuki no Tamatebako in August 2012

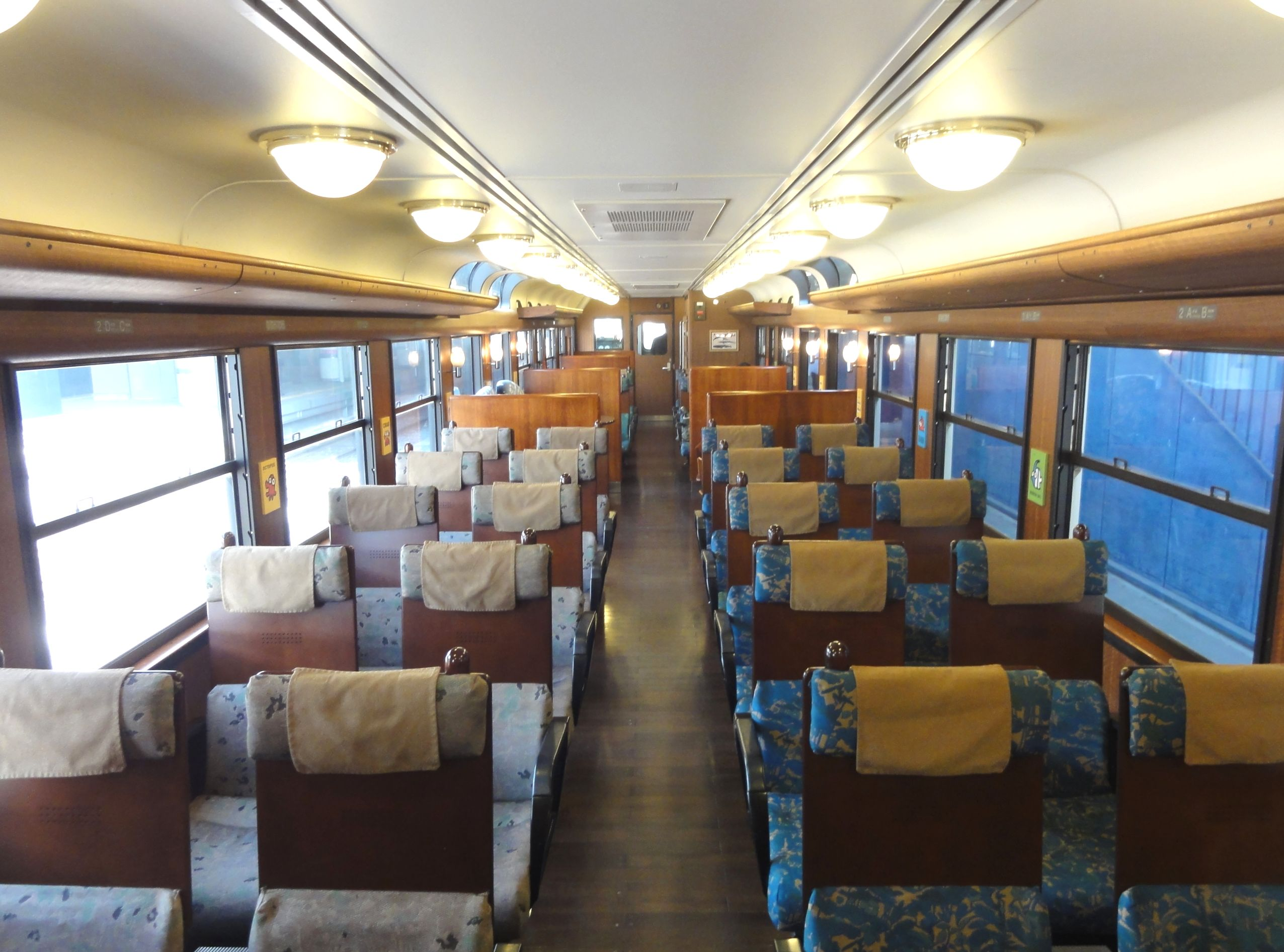
Interior of Ibusuki no Tamatebako

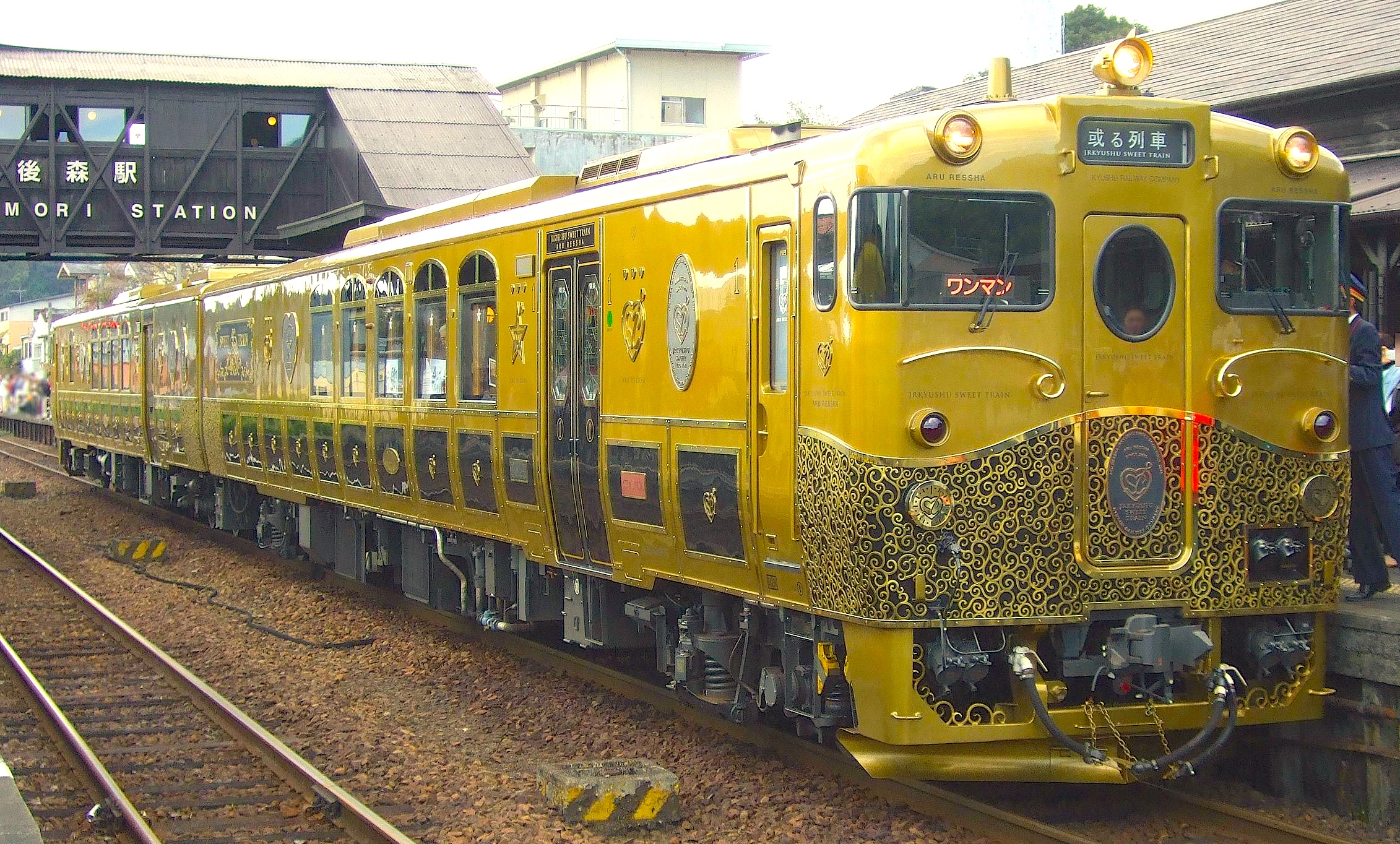
Aru Ressha in October 2015

== Resale ==
=== Nishikigawa Railway ===
In 2017, KiHa 40 1009 was taken over by Nishikigawa Railway, that ended operation on the Karasuyama Line by JR East in March 2017. The former diesel train is remodeled in retro style, and started operation on September 16 of the same year.

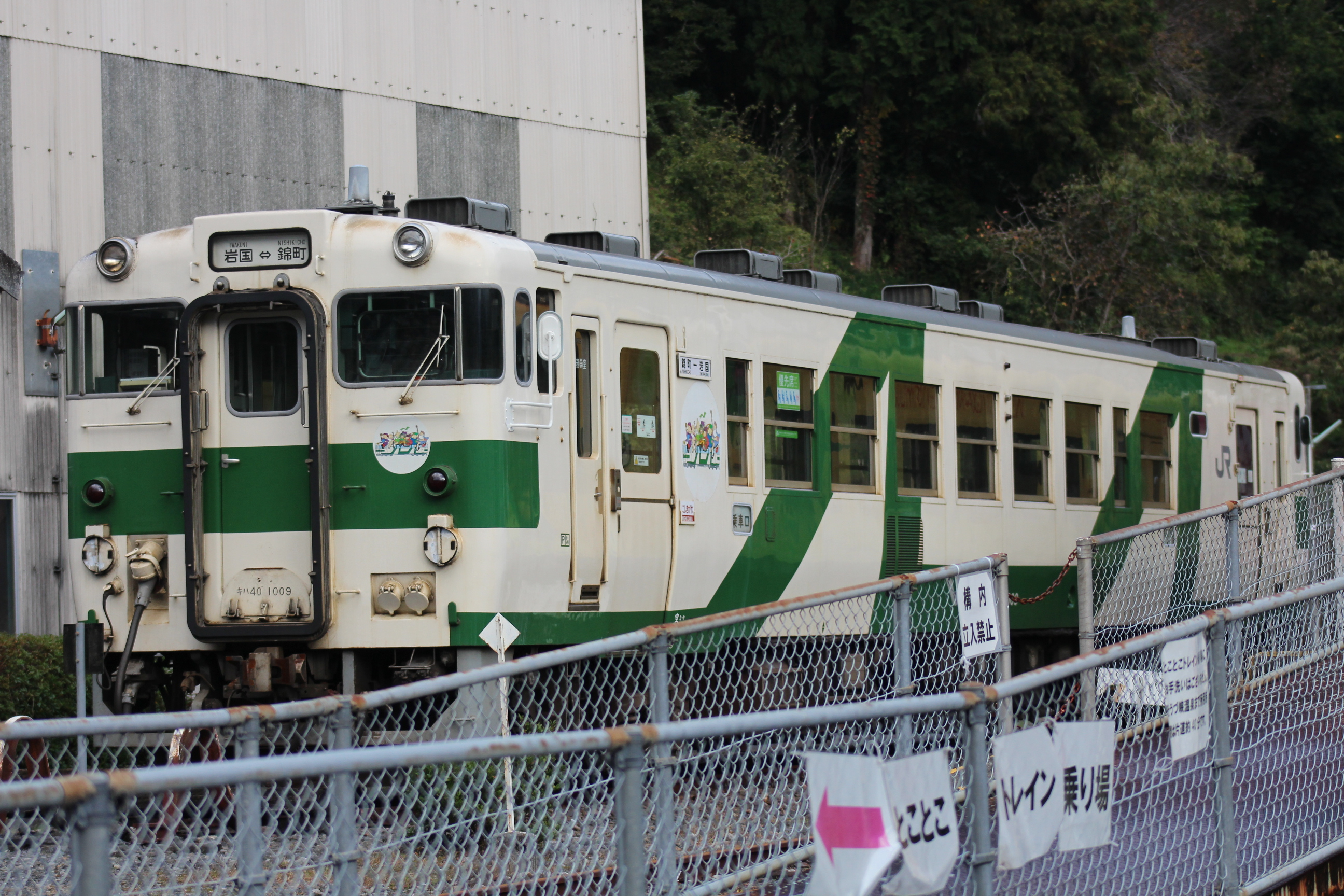
Former JR East KiHa 40 series DMU car KiHa 40 1009 at Nishikichō Station on the Nishikigawa Railway in Yamaguchi Prefecture, Japan.

=== Kominato Railway ===
Two KiHa 40 carriages (KiHa 40 2021 and KiHa 40 2026), which ended operation on the Tadami Line in March 2020, were transferred to Kominato Railway in May 2020 with the Tohoku livery.

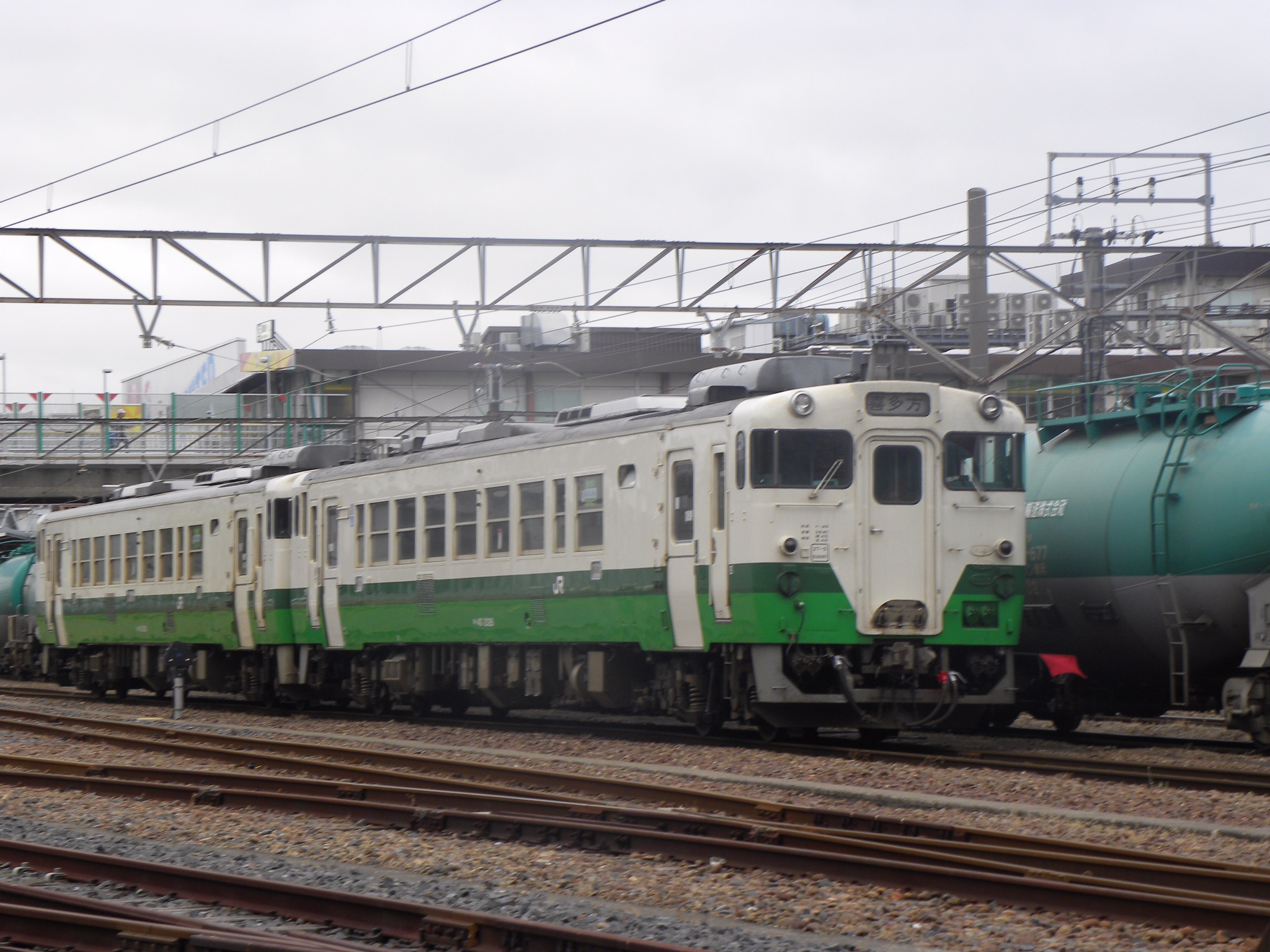
The former JR East KiHa 40 is scheduled to be transferred to Kominato Railway is detained at Soga Station.

=== Hojo Railway ===
The latest acquisition purchased by the third-sector railway company which has been funded by the local government of Kasai City to purchase a retired unit from JR East which had been recently ended their local services in Gono Line on 2021. The local government had been successfully collected their crowdfunding at a cost of about 30 million yen (approx. $220,000) for purchasing cost, shipment from Akita Prefecture and for remodeling or refurbishment to make it like new. The railcar has been successfully remodeled and started began their operation in March 2022 with retaining its former livery used in Gono Line by JR East.

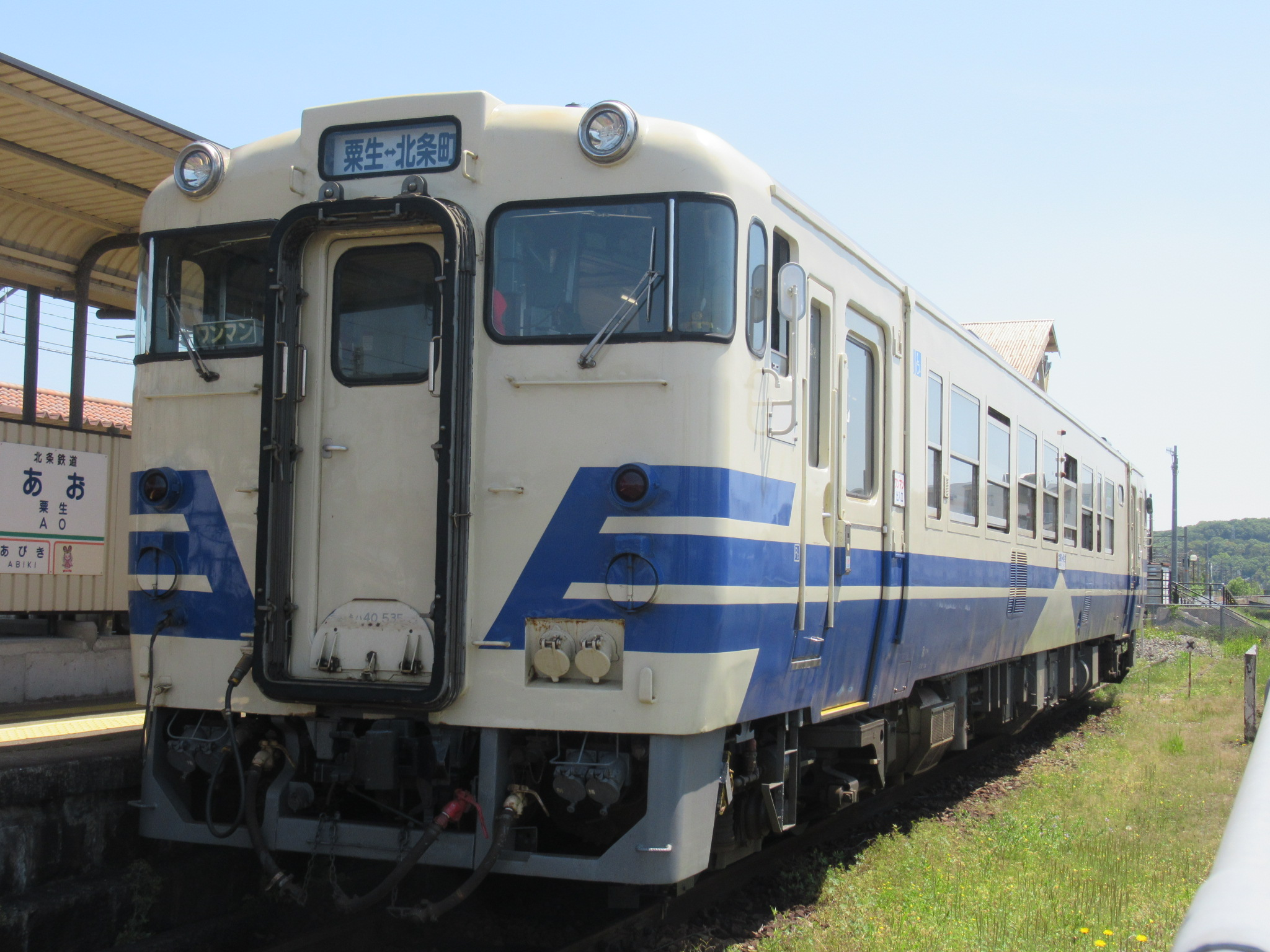
Kiha 40–535 at Ao Station in May 2022

=== Conversions ===
Aizu Railway's AT-400 DMU was converted from a former JR East KiHa 40.

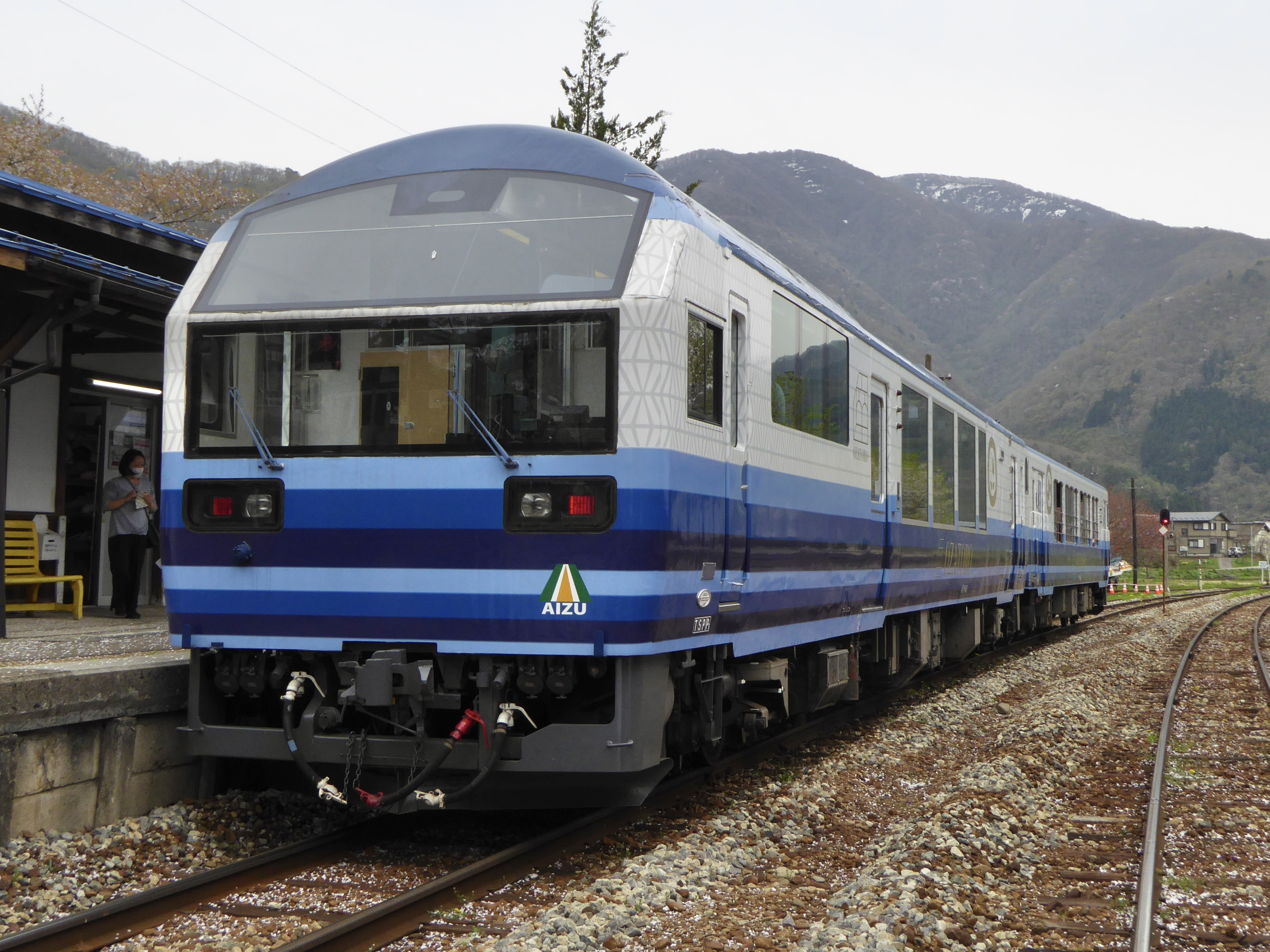
Aizu Railway AT-400 in April 2022

== Overseas operations ==
=== Myanmar ===
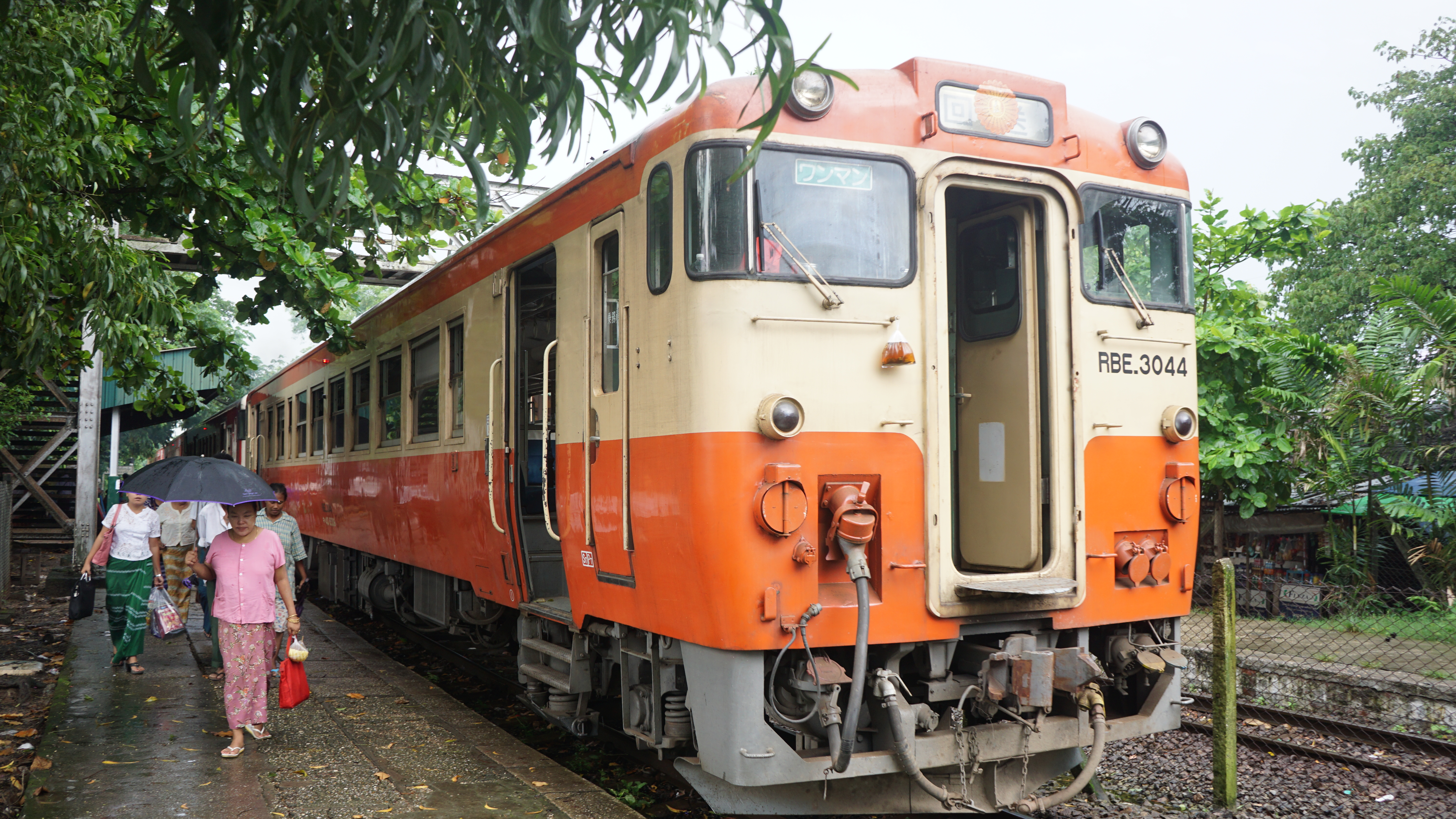
A former KiHa 40 series train in Myanmar in July 2016

A large fleet of former KiHa 40 series cars from JR East, JR Hokkaido, JR Shikoku, and JR Central were shipped to Myanmar between 2011 and 2016. A total of 48 diesel cars (including KiHa 40, KiHa 47, & KiHa 48) have been shipped to Myanmar for overseas operations. The cars are used on the Yangon Circular Railway.

=== Thailand ===
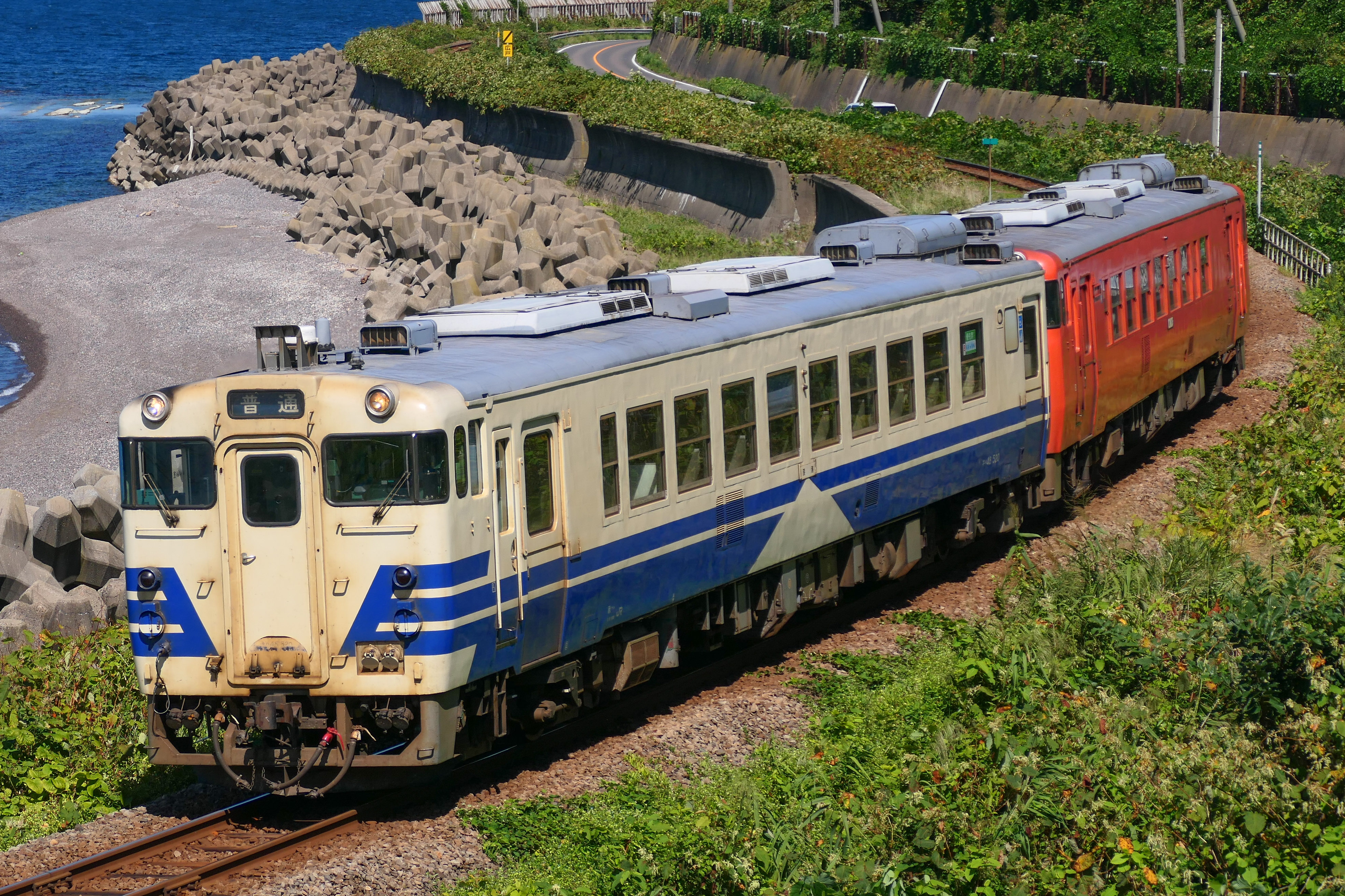
KiHa 48 520, originally used to operate the Gonō Line, has been decommissioned since 12 March 2021, later donated to the State Railway of Thailand.

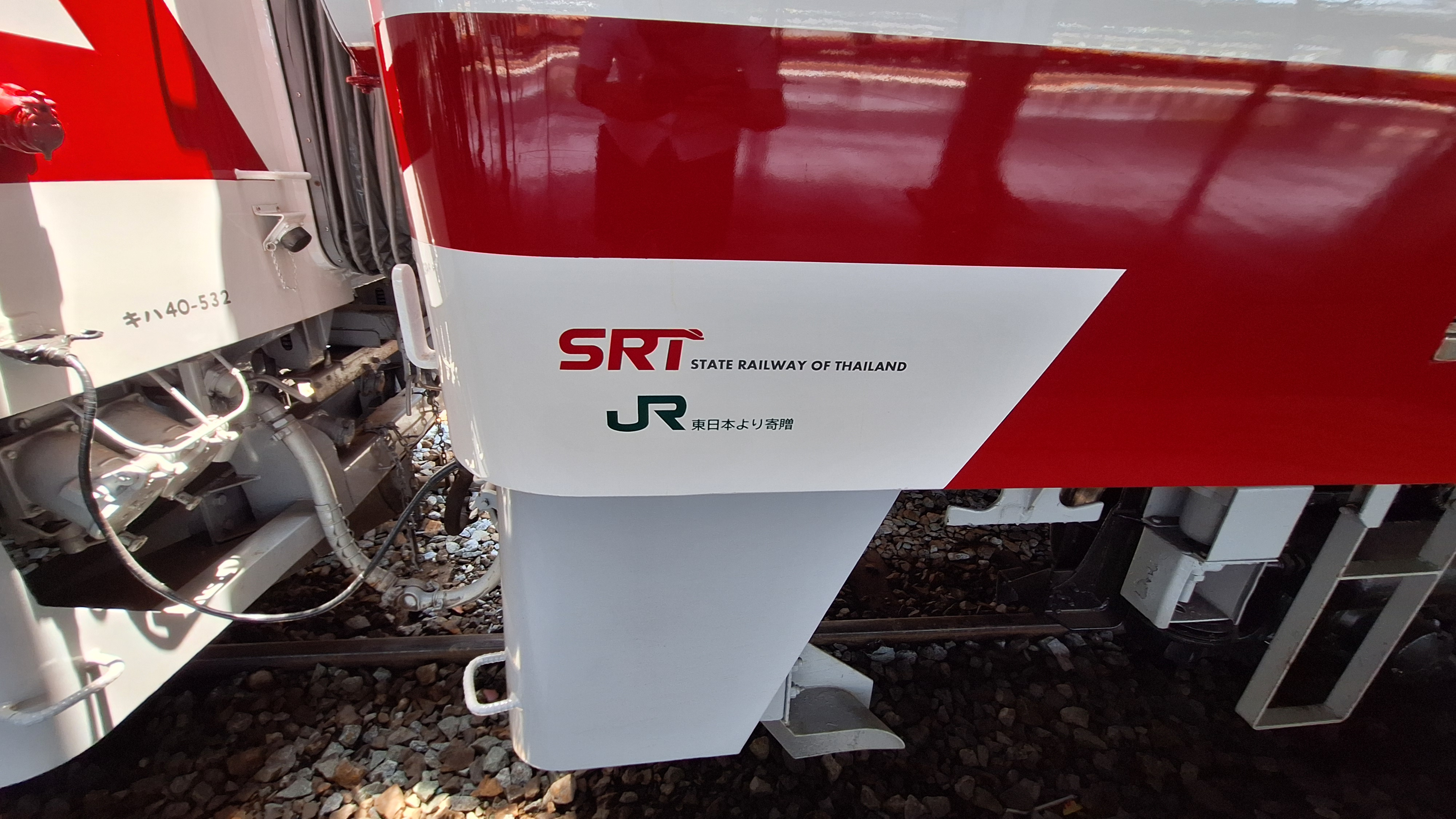
SRT and JR East label on refurbish KiHa 40 series at Bangkok (Hua Lamphong) station.

A total of 20 former KiHa 40 & 48 cars from JR East are expected to be shipped to Thailand for overseas operations by the State Railway of Thailand (SRT). On 27 March 2024, these cars were handed over to SRT prior to shipping from Niigata Port. On June 2, 2024, the KiHa 40 & 48 cars arrived in Thailand and the gauge conversion from 1,067 mm (Japan) to 1,000 mm commenced.

SRT has received the following KiHa 40 & 48 cars:

- KiHa 40-521 (Gono)
- KiHa 40-522 (Shutoken)
- KiHa 40-528 (Gono)
- KiHa 40-532 (Gono)
- KiHa 40-536 (Oga)
- KiHa 40-543 (Oga)
- KiHa 40-544 (Oga)
- KiHa 40-547 (Oga)
- KiHa 40-575 (Oga)
- KiHa 48-515 (Gono)
- KiHa 48-516 (Gono)
- KiHa 48-518 (Gono)
- KiHa 48-520 (Gono)
- KiHa 48-522 (Oga)
- KiHa 48-537 (Oga)
- KiHa 48-544 (Shutoken)
- KiHa 48-1507 (Oga)
- KiHa 48-1509 (Gono)
- KiHa 48-1540 (Gono)
- KiHa 48-1550 (Gono)

== Preserved examples ==
- KiHa 40 519: Next to Onagawa Station, Onagawa, Miyagi. However, it was damaged by the 2011 Tōhoku earthquake and tsunami on 11 March 2011, and was withdrawn.
- KiHa 40 764: Next to Ikutora Station, Minamifurano, Hokkaido as a cutaway body. This DMU was modified to resemble a KiHa 12 unit and used in Yasuo Furuhata's 1999 film Poppoya (鉄道員, Poppoya / Tetsudōin; "Railwayman").
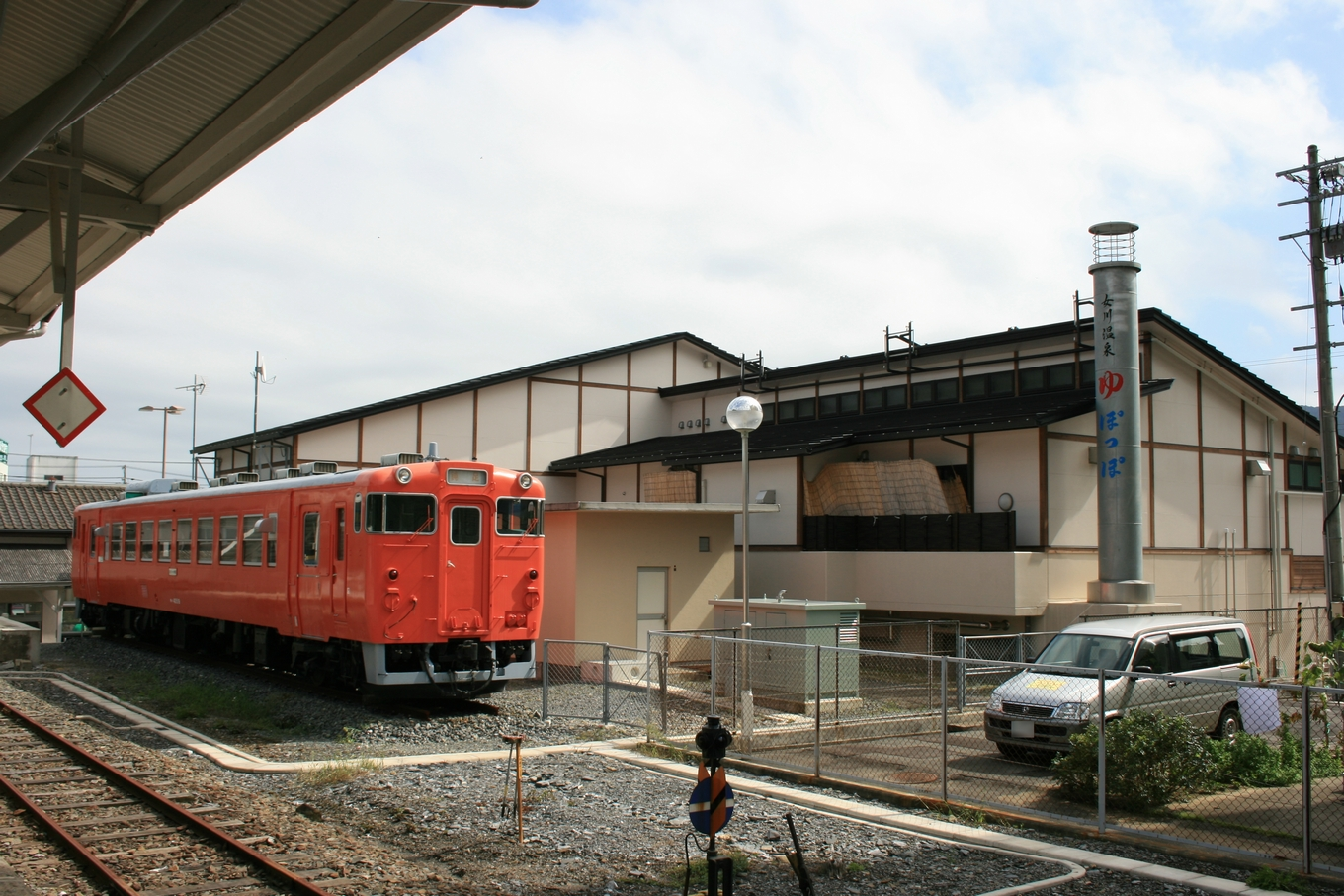
Preserved KiHa 40 519 next to Onagawa Station in September 2007

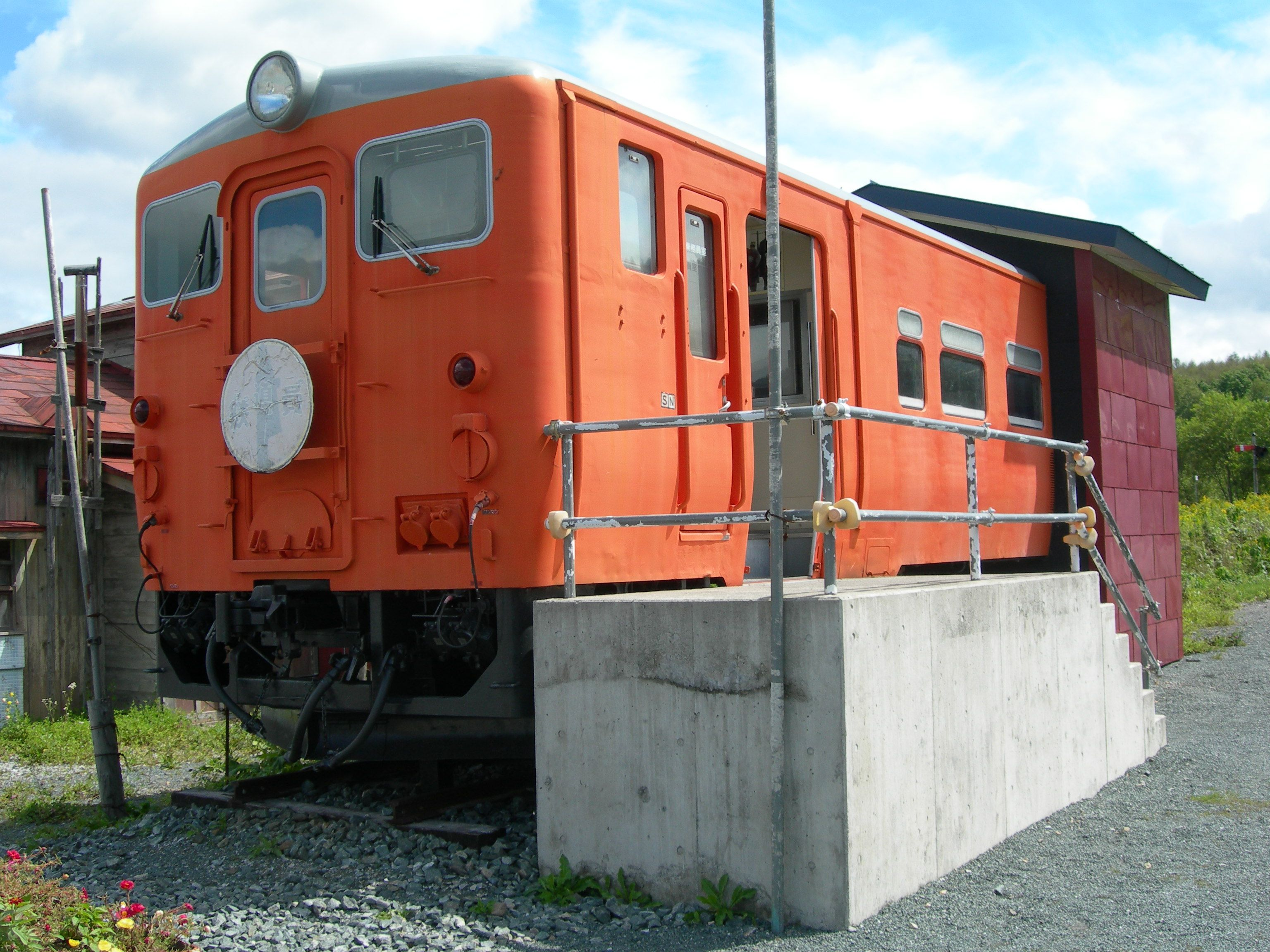
KiHa 40 764 in August 2011

== In popular culture ==
- The KiHa 40 is featured as a non-driveable train in the Microsoft Train Simulator computer game.
- In 2017 NHK World-Japan dedicated an episode of their weekly show Japan Railway Journal to the KiHa 40 series.
- The KiHa 40 will be a driveable train on the Tadami Line route in the Train Sim World series.
