= Resort Shirakami =

Japanese sightseeing train service

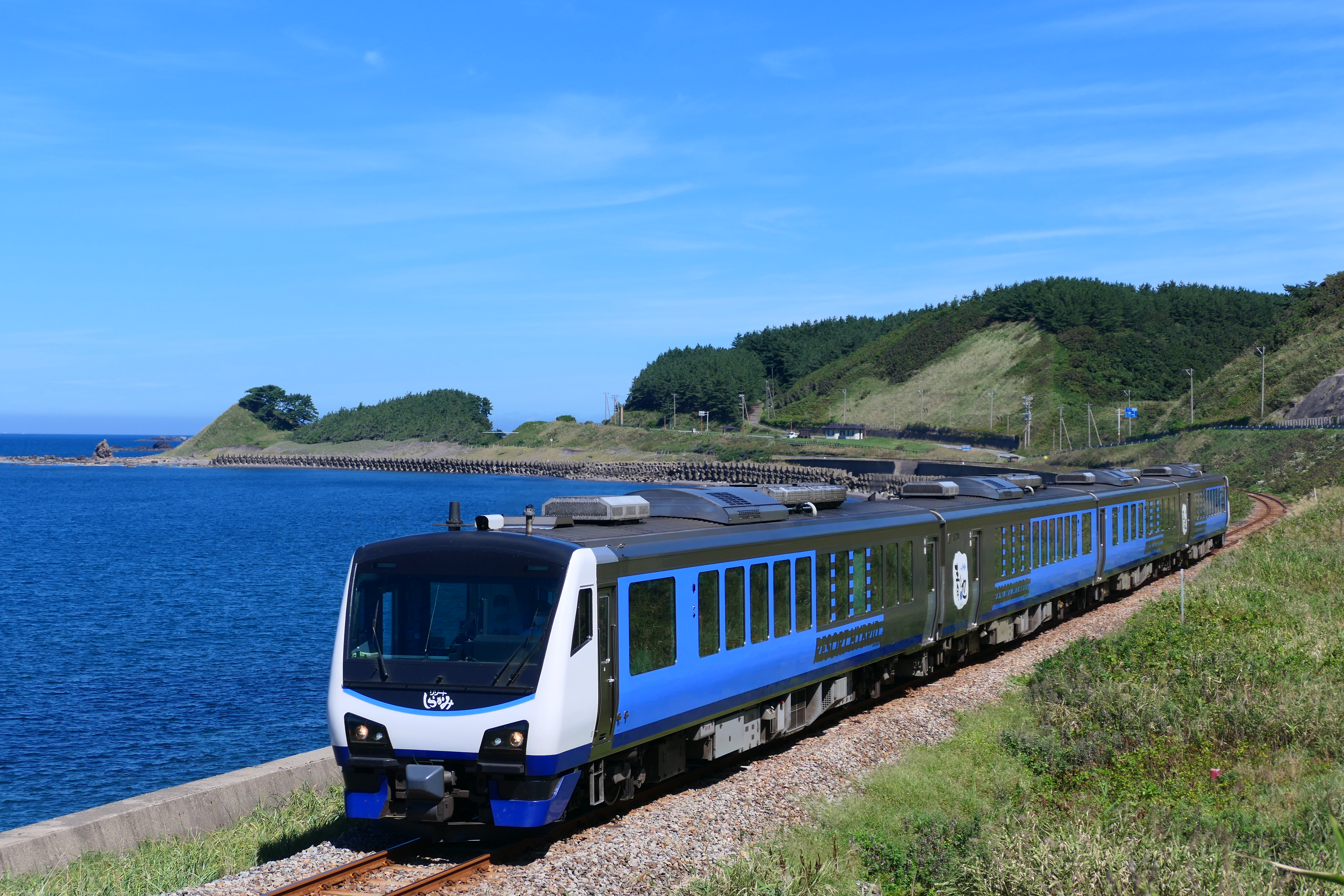
- HB-E300 series Aoike set in September 2020

Overview
- Service type: Rapid/ Sightseeing train
- Status: Operational
- Locale: Japan
- Predecessor: Nostalgic View Train
- First service: March 1997
- Current operator: JR East

Route
- Termini: Akita; Hirosaki, Aomori
- Stops: 23
- Distance travelled: 247.6 km (153.9 mi)
- Average journey time: approx. 5 hours
- Service frequency: 3 return workings daily
- Lines used: Ōu Main Line, Gonō Line

On-board services
- Class: Standard only
- Disabled access: Yes
- Seating arrangements: 2+2 unidirectional + compartments
- Sleeping arrangements: None
- Catering facilities: Yes
- Observation facilities: Yes
- Entertainment facilities: Yes
- Other facilities: Toilets

Technical
- Rolling stock: KiHa 48, HB-E300 series DMUs
- Track gauge: 1,067 mm (3 ft 6 in)
- Electrification: None
- Operating speed: 100 km/h (62 mph)
- Track owner: JR East

The Resort Shirakami (リゾートしらかみ, Rizōto Shirakami) is a limited-stop "Rapid" service operated by the East Japan Railway Company (JR East) as a sightseeing train along the scenic coastal Gonō Line in the north of Japan since March 1997.

== Operations ==
The train service operates between Akita and Aomori via the Ōu Main Line and Gonō Line, with the journey taking approximately 5 hours. Three return services run daily, with one service operating between Akita and Hirosaki only, and the other two reversing at Hirosaki.

== Stops ==
Trains stop at the following stations:

Akita - Oiwake - Hachirōgata - (Moritake) - Higashi-Noshiro - Noshiro - Akita-Shirakami - Iwadate - Jūniko - WeSPa-Tsubakiyama - Fukaura - (Senjōjiki) - Ajigasawa - Mutsu-Morita - Kizukuri - Goshogawara - Mutsu-Tsuruda - Itayanagi - Fujisaki - Kawabe - Hirosaki - Shin-Aomori - Aomori

Stations in brackets () are stations where not all trains stop at or stations which are only called at during certain times of the year.

- Resort Shirakami no. 4, 5, 3 and 6 do not stop at Moritake.
- Trains only stop at Senjōjiki at certain times of the year.

== Rolling stock ==
Services are operated by three dedicated four-car diesel multiple unit sets based at Akita Depot, named Aoike (青池), Buna (橅), and Kumagera (くまげら), converted from former KiHa 48 DMU cars. The original KiHa 48 Aoike trainset was replaced by a new HB-E300 series hybrid DMU set, which entered service on 4 December 2010. An additional four-car HB-E300 series hybrid DMU set was built for use on Buna services from July 2016, replacing the KiHa 48 DMU set previously used. The exterior livery and interior design was overseen by Ken Okuyama Design.

- Aoike KiHa 48 4-car DMU (March 1997 – 2010)
- Buna KiHa 48 4-car DMU (April 2003 – July 2016)
- Kumagera KiHa 48 4-car DMU (since March 2006)
- Aoike HB-E300 series 4-car hybrid DMU (since December 2010)
- Buna HB-E300 series 4-car hybrid DMU (from 16 July 2016)

All cars are no-smoking, and all seats require advance seat reservations.

=== KiHa 48 Aoike ===
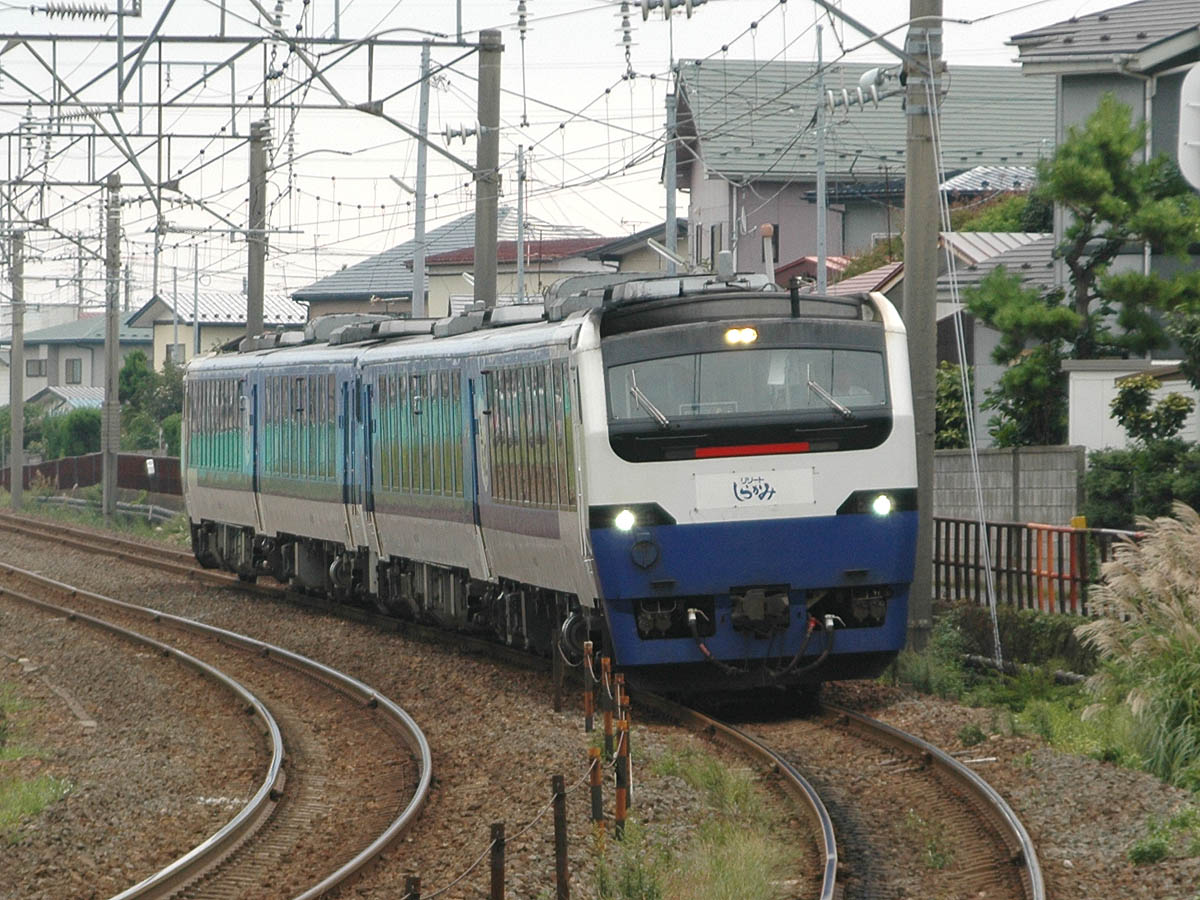
The original KiHa 48 Aoike 4-car set in September 2005

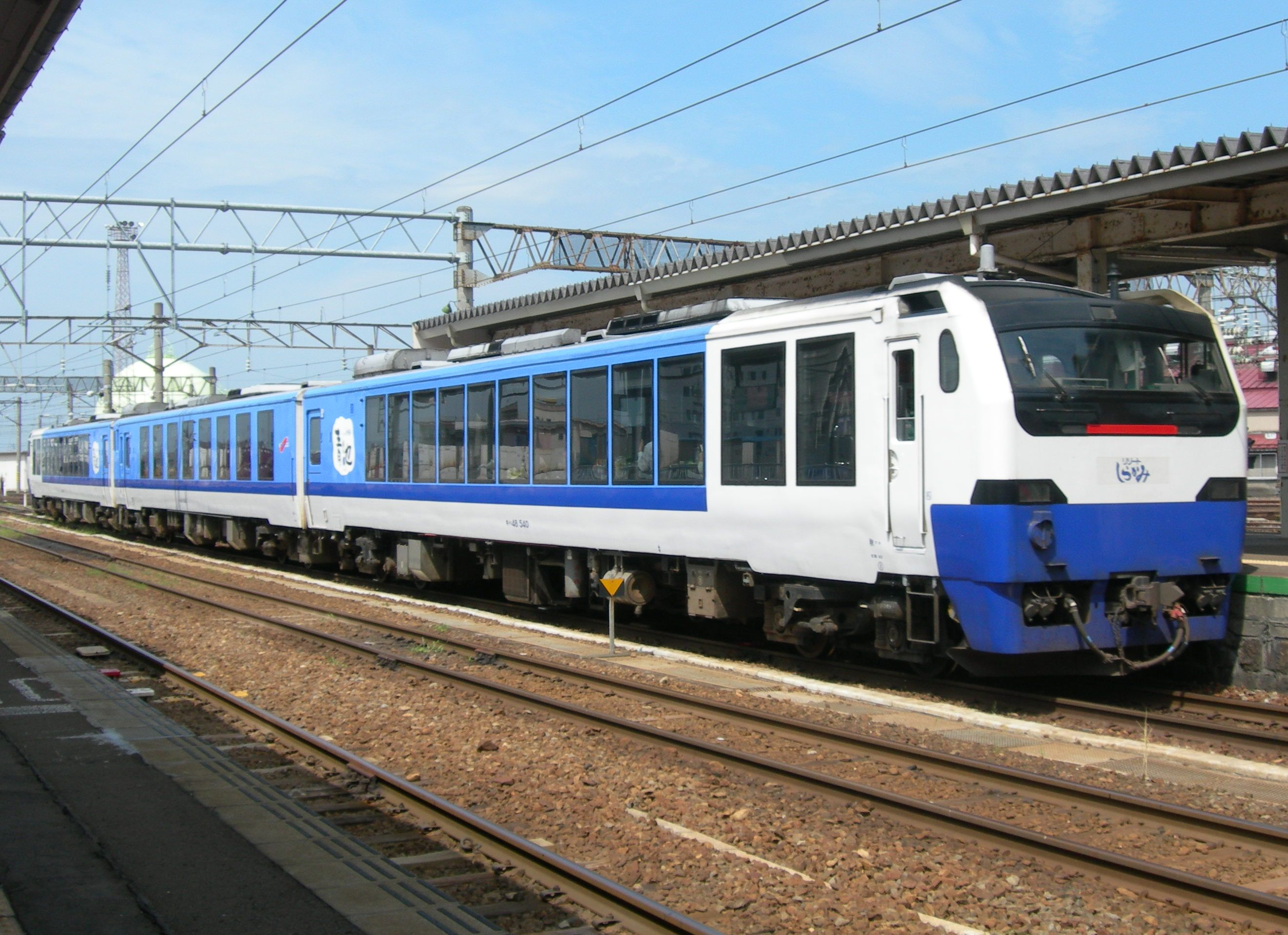
The KiHa 48 Aoike set reduced to 3 cars, in August 2010

This was the first Resort Shirakami trainset introduced, converted from former KiHa DMU cars at JR East's Tsuchizaki Works, and entering service in March 1997. It was initially formed as a four-car set, as shown below. The end cars were built with new cab ends, while the two inner cars retained their original driving cabs. The name Aoike was added in March 2003 to distinguish it from the second Resort Shirakami ("Buna").

Car No.	1	2	3	4
Number	KiHa 48 533	KiHa 48 1521	KiHa 48 1543	KiHa 48 540
Seating capacity	40	32	32	40

From March 2006, the set was reduced to three cars, as shown below, with car KiHa 48 1521 repainted and inserted into the newly created Kumagera trainset.

Car No.	1	2	3
Number	KiHa 48 533	KiHa 48 1543	KiHa 48 540
Seating capacity	40	32	40

The end cars had large panorama windows and featured conventional unidirectional seating, with a small lounge space behind the driving cabs. The two inner cars each had eight four-person semi-open compartments.

This set was replaced in 2010 by a new 4-car HB-E300 series hybrid DMU set, and was reformed as a two-car trainset for use on other lines from February 2011, branded as Cruising Train (クルージングトレイン).

=== KiHa 48 Buna ===
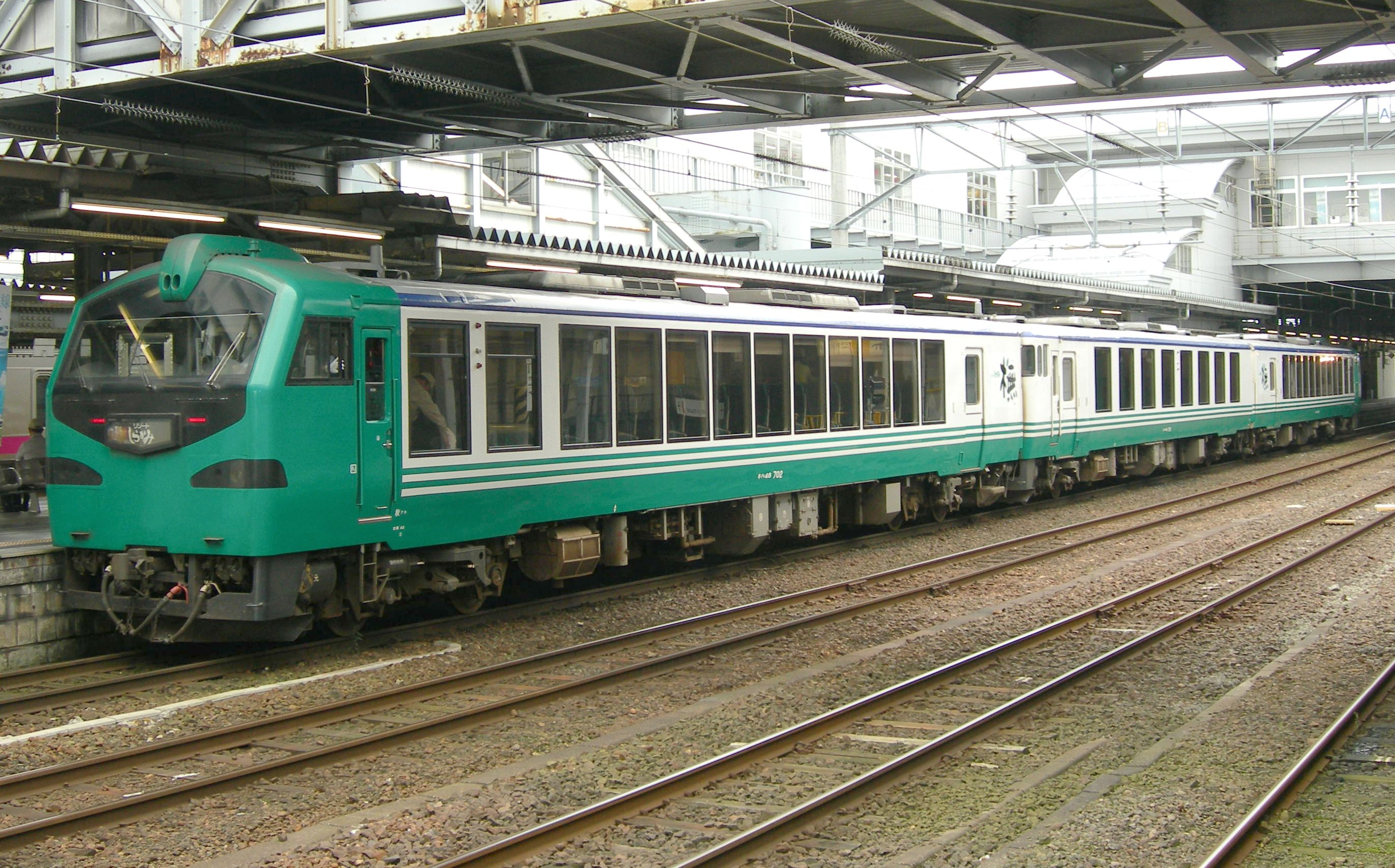
The KiHa 48 Buna 3-car set in October 2010

Following the popularity of the original Resort Shirakami (Aoike) trainset, a second set was built in March 2003, from former KiHa 40 DMU cars at JR East's Tsuchizaki Works, and named Buna (橅; "Japanese beech"). This train entered service on 1 April 2003, and was initially formed as a 3-car set as shown below.

Car No.	1	2	3
Number	KiHa 48 701	KiHa 48 1701	KiHa 48 702
Seating capacity	39	32	40

In December 2010, it was lengthened to four cars with the addition of KiHa 1543, formerly part of the original Aoike set, and formed as shown below.

Car No.	1	2	3	4
Number	KiHa 48 701	KiHa 48 1701	KiHa 1543	KiHa 48 702
Seating capacity	39	32	32	40

The former identities of the rebuilt cars are as follows.

Current number	Former number
KiHa 48 701	KiHa 40 506
KiHa 48 1701	KiHa 40 507
KiHa 48 1543	KiHa 48 1543 (unchanged)
KiHa 48 702	KiHa 40 510

As with the earlier Aoike set, the end cars have large panorama windows and feature conventional 2+2 abreast unidirectional seating, with a small lounge space behind the driving cabs. The inner car has semi-open compartments with seats that can pulled out to create a flat seating space. It also included a smoking compartment.

=== KiHa 48 Kumagera ===
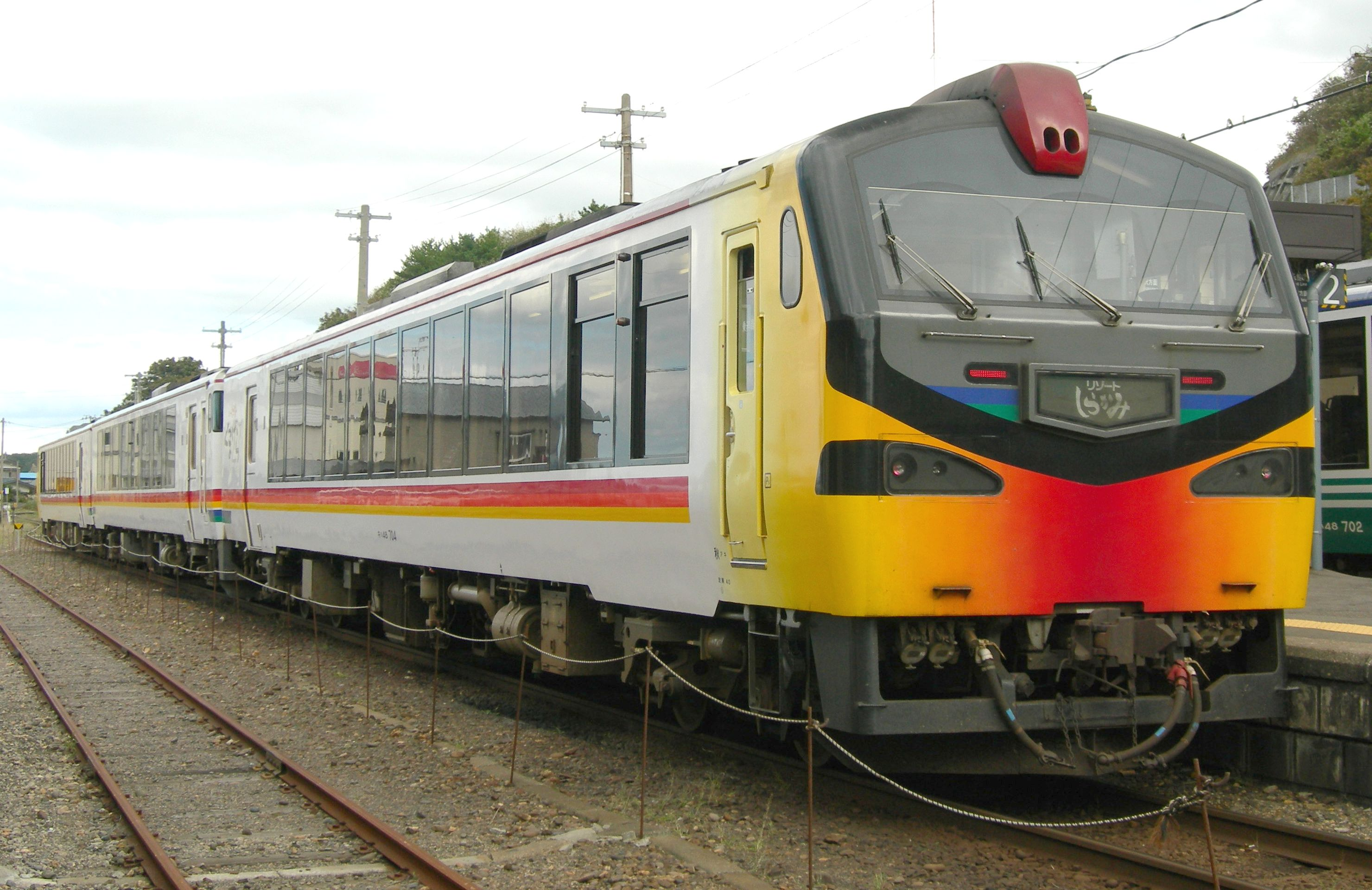
The KiHa 48 Kumagera 3-car set in October 2010

This was the third Resort Shirakami trainset to be built, entering service on 18 March 2006. The name Kumagera is the Japanese name for the black woodpecker, which lives in the Shirakami-Sanchi area, a World Heritage Site. This train was initially formed as a 3-car set as shown below. Car KiHa 48 1521 was originally included in the Aoike trainset.

Car No.	1	2	3
Number	KiHa 48 703	KiHa 48 1521	KiHa 48 704
Seating capacity	39	32	40

In December 2010, it was lengthened to four cars, formed as shown below .

Car No.	1	2	3	4
Number	KiHa 48 703	KiHa 48 1521	KiHa 1503	KiHa 48 704
Seating capacity	39	32	40	40

The former identities of the rebuilt cars are as follows.

Current number	Former number
KiHa 48 702	KiHa 40 506
KiHa 48 1521	KiHa 48 1521 (unchanged)
KiHa 48 1503	KiHa 48 1503 (unchanged)
KiHa 48 704	KiHa 40 510

As with the earlier trainsets, the end cars have large panorama windows, ten rows of conventional 2+2 abreast unidirectional seating, and a small lounge space behind the driving cabs. The inner car has eight semi-open compartments with seats that can pulled out to create a flat seating space.

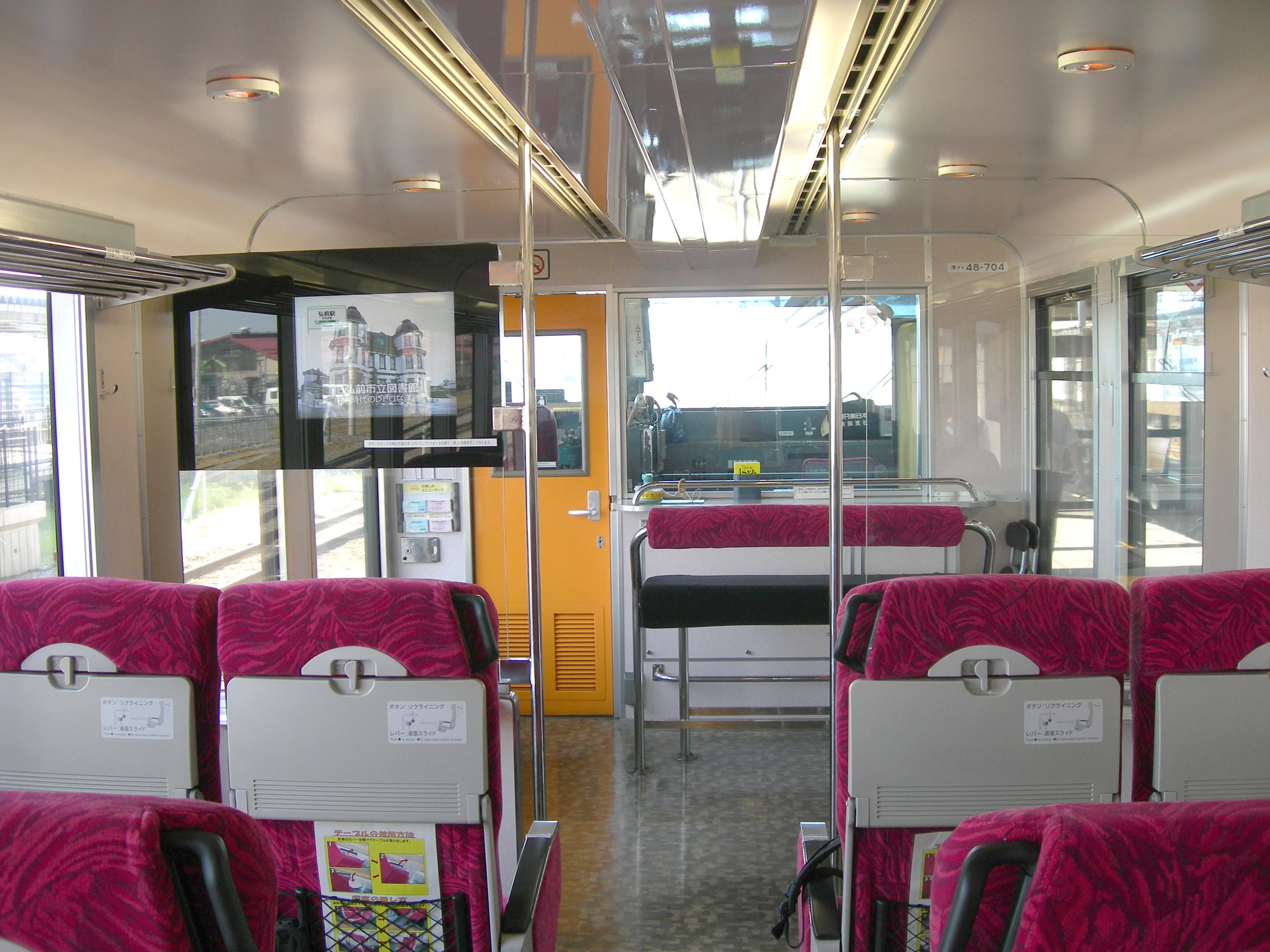
Interior of Kumagera set looking forward, August 2010

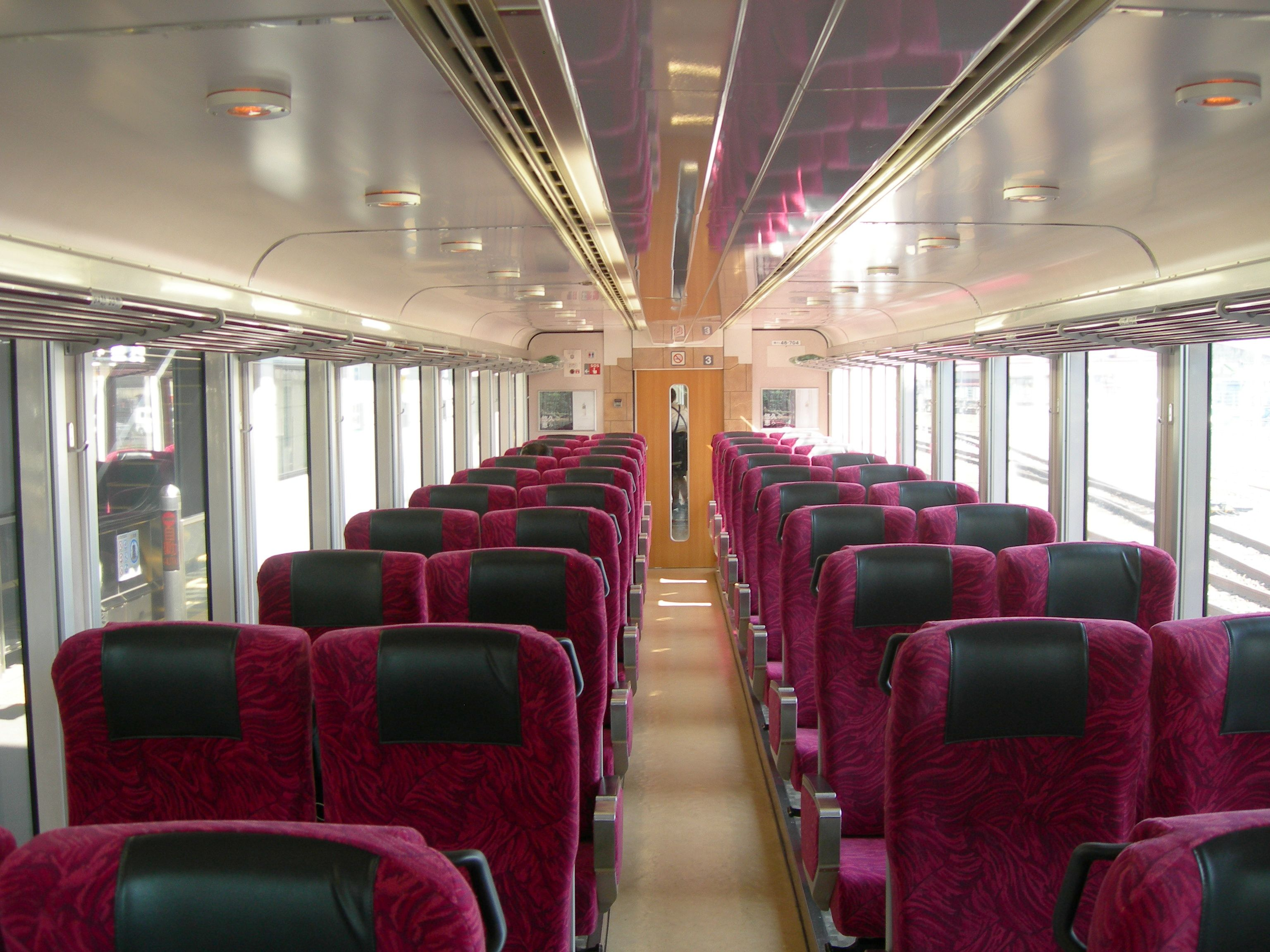
Interior of Kumagera set car 3, August 2010

=== HB-E300 series Aoike ===
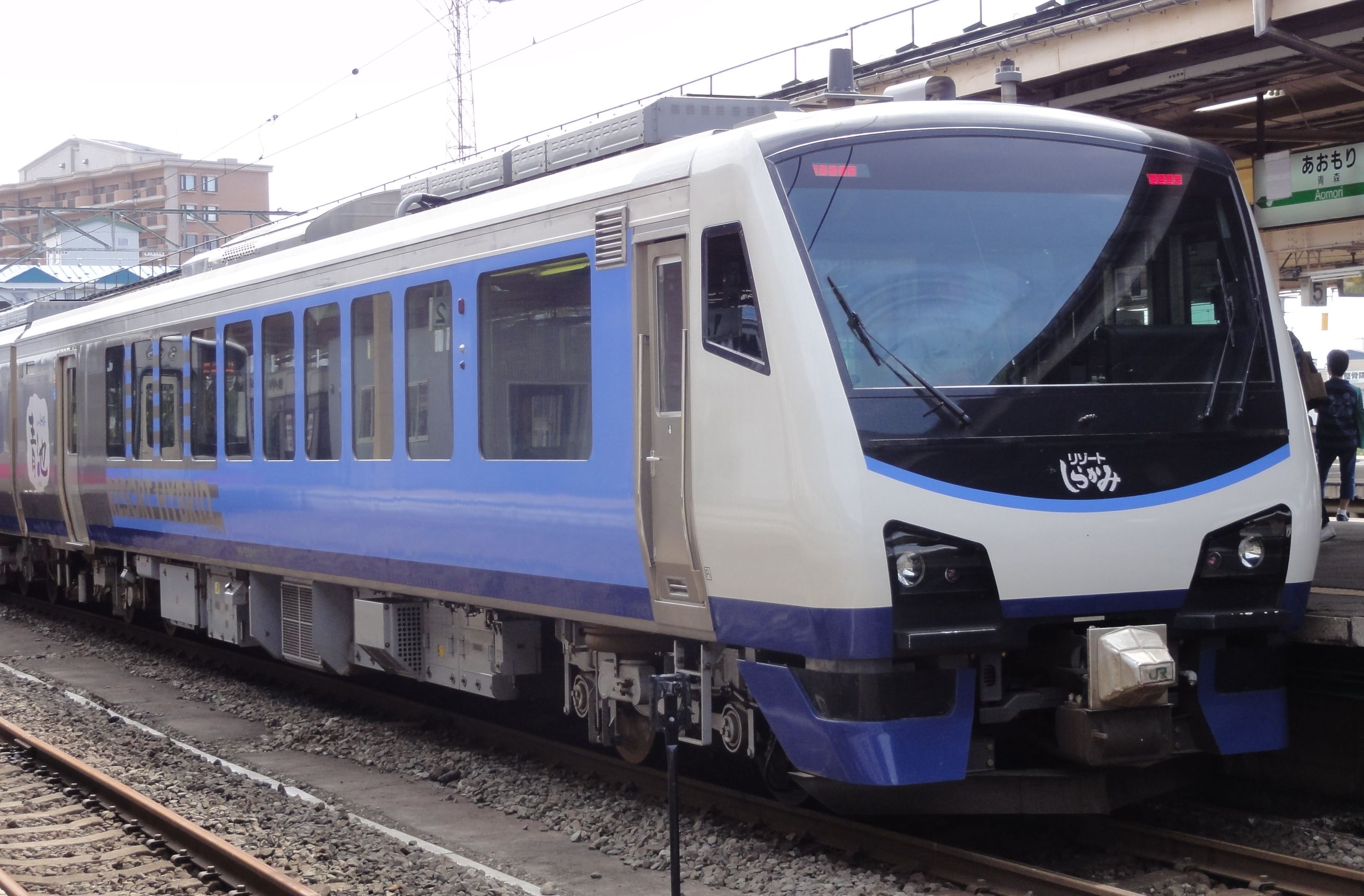
The HB-E300 series Aoike set in June 2011

This is a four-car hybrid DMU set, which replaced the original KiHa 48 Aoike set and entered service from 4 December 2010.

The trainset is formed as shown below.

Car	1	2	3	4
Number	HB-E301-1	HB-E300-101	HB-E300-1	HB-E302-1
Seating capacity	34	36	40	44

The end cars have conventional 2+2 abreast unidirectional seating, and a small lounge space behind the driving cabs. The inner cars have semi-open compartments.

=== HB-E300 series Buna ===
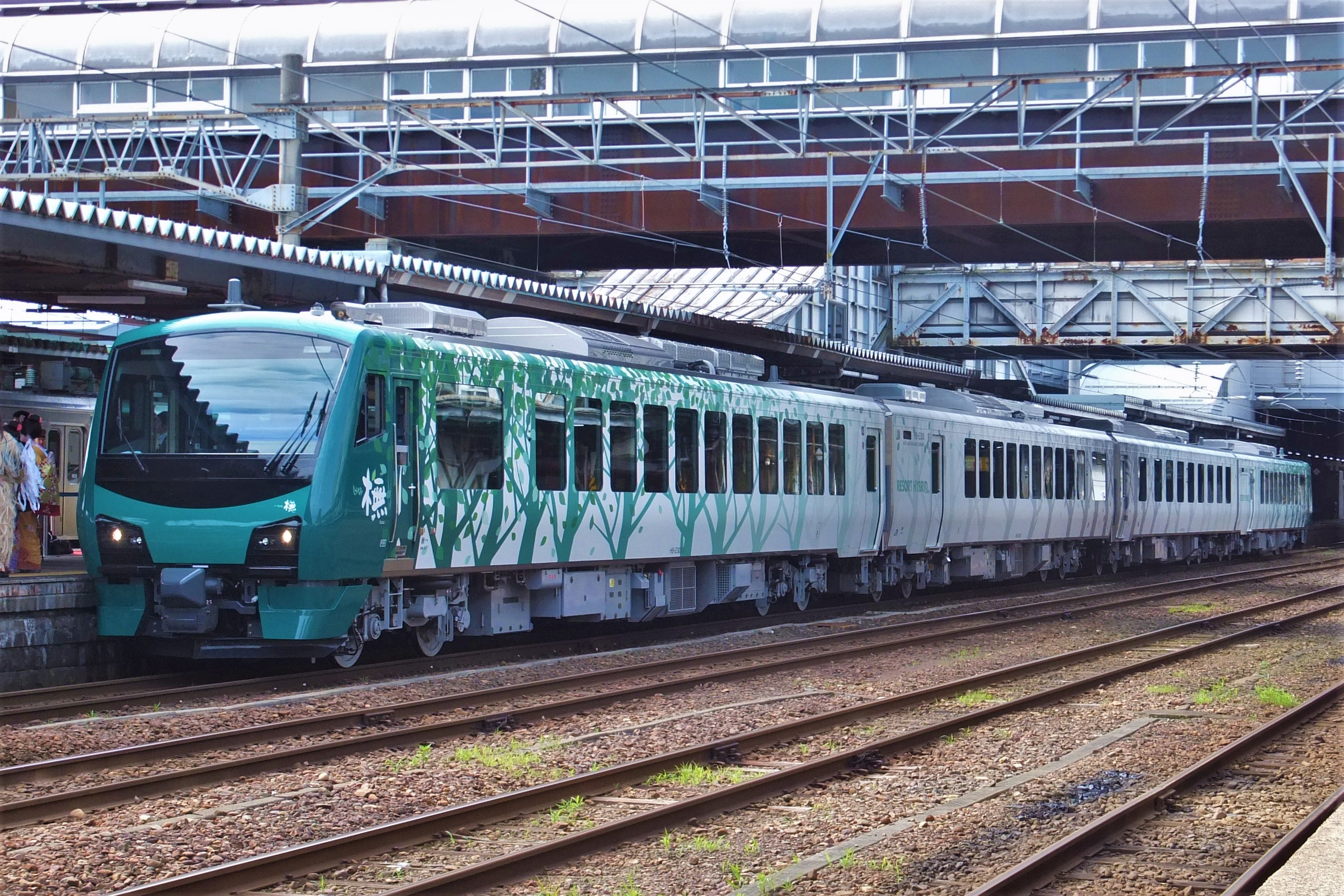
The HB-E300 series Buna set in July 2016

This is a four-car hybrid DMU set introduced on 16 July 2016, replacing the original KiHa 48 Buna set.

The trainset is formed as shown below.

Car	1	2	3	4
Numbering	HB-E301-5	HB-E300-105	HB-E300-5	HB-E302-5

Cars 1, 2, and 4 have conventional 2+2 abreast unidirectional seating, while car 3 has semi-open compartments.

== History ==
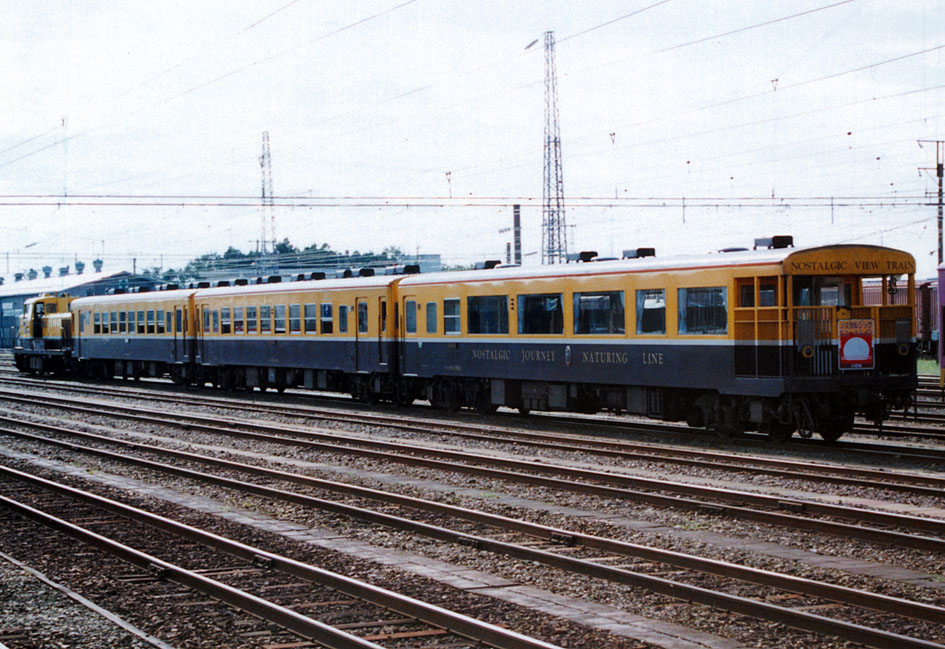
The Nostalgic View Train circa 1992

The Resort Shirakami service was introduced in March 1997, coinciding with the opening of the Akita Shinkansen. It replaced the locomotive-hauled Nostalgic View Train (ノスタルジックビュートレイン), formed of three converted 50 series coaches, which previously operated as a sightseeing train on the Gono Line.

A new HB-E300 series 4-car hybrid DMU trainset entered service as the Resort Shirakami - Aoike from 4 December 2010, replacing the original KiHa 48 DMU set, and coinciding with the opening of the Tohoku Shinkansen extension to Shin-Aomori.

== See also ==
- List of named passenger trains of Japan
- Excursion train
- Joyful Train, the generic name for tourist trains in Japan
