= HB-E300 series =

Japanese train type

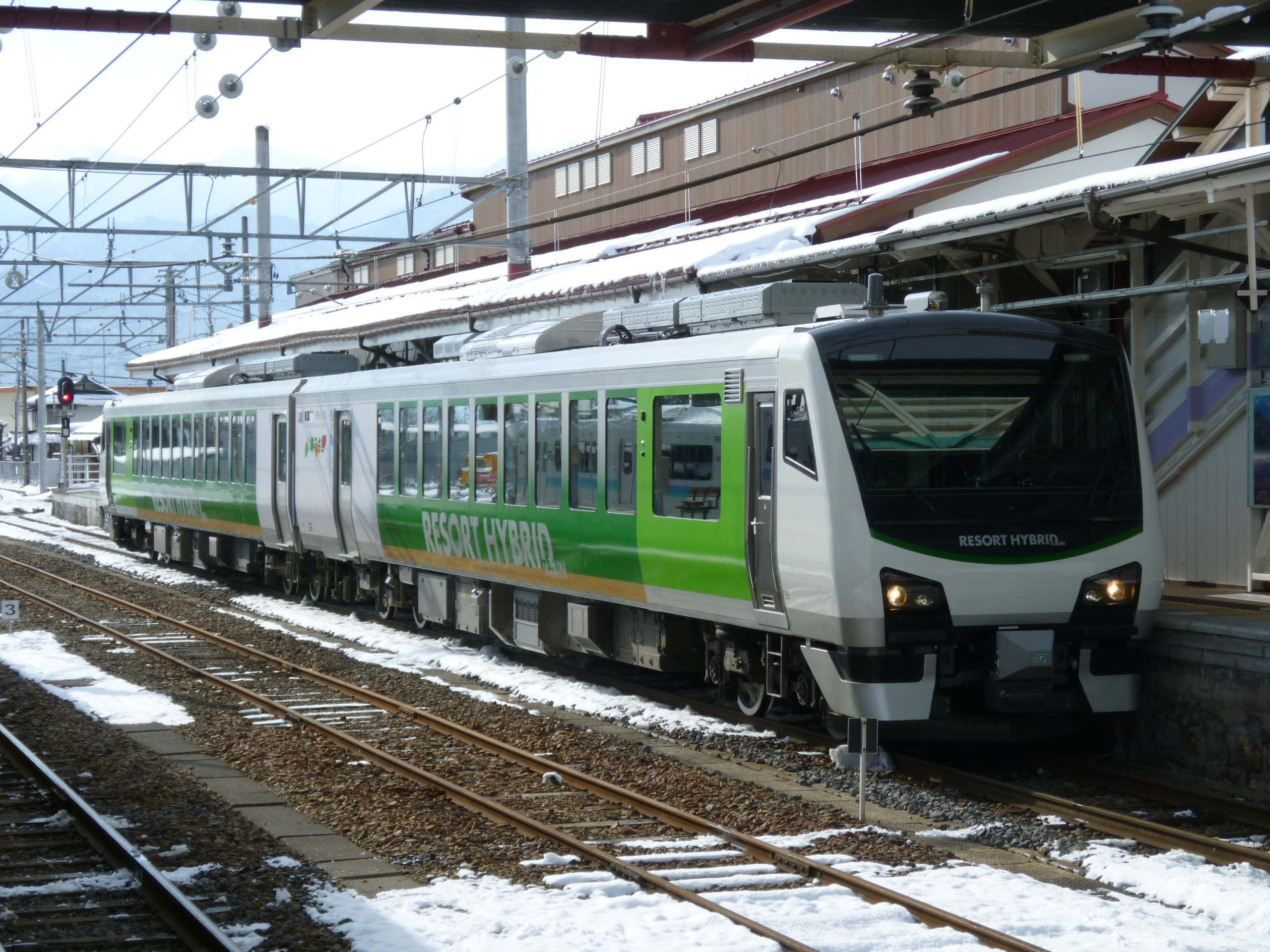
- 2-car Resort View Furusato set at Shinano-Ōmachi Station in December 2010
- In service: October 2010 – present
- Manufacturers: JR East; Niigata Transys; Tokyu Car Corporation; J-TREC
- Family name: Resort Hybrid
- Replaced: KiHa 48
- Constructed: 2010, 2016, 2019
- Number built: 18 vehicles (6 sets)
- Number in service: 18 vehicles (6 sets)
- Formation: 2/4 cars per set
- Operator: JR East
- Depots: Akita, Aomori, Nagano, Niigata
- Lines served: Ōito Line, Tsugaru Line, Ōminato Line, Gonō Line

Specifications
- Car body construction: Stainless steel
- Car length: 20,600 mm (67 ft 7 in)
- Width: 2,920 mm (9 ft 7 in)
- Height: 3,620 mm (11 ft 11 in)
- Doors: One per side
- Maximum speed: 100 km/h (62 mph)
- Traction system: Variable frequency
- Prime mover: DMF15HZB-G (1 per car)
- Engine type: 6-cylinder diesel
- Traction motors: MT78 (95 kW [127 hp]) (2 per car)
- Power output: 331 kW (444 hp) per engine
- Bogies: DT75A (driving), TR260A (trailing)
- Braking system: Electronically controlled pneumatic brakes with regenerative braking
- Safety system: ATS-P/Ps
- Multiple working: KiHa E200
- Track gauge: 1,067 mm (3 ft 6 in)

The HB-E300 series (HB-E300系) is a hybrid diesel multiple unit (DMU) train type operated by East Japan Railway Company (JR East) on "resort train" services on scenic lines in Japan since October 2010.

== Design ==
The HB-E300 series is based on the KiHa E200 hybrid DMU type introduced on the Koumi Line in 2007. One 2-car train is used on the Ōito Line; two 2-car trains are used on the Tsugaru and Ōminato Lines; and two 4-car trains are used on Gonō Line Resort Shirakami services, replacing earlier KiHa 48 DMU trainsets.

The use of hybrid technology is designed to reduce fuel consumption by 10% compared with the existing Resort Shirakami trains, reduce NOx emissions by 60%, and reduce noise levels by 20 dB while idling at stations and by 30 dB when accelerating from standstill.

== Interior ==
Seating in open saloon cars features reclining/rotating seating in 2+2 configuration with a seat pitch of 1,200 mm (47 in). The four-car Resort Shirakami sets include compartment accommodation.

== 2-car Resort View Furusato ==
The two-car train for the Ōito Line is branded Resort View Furusato (リゾートビューふるさと). It was built by Tokyu Car Corporation in Yokohama, and delivered to Nagano in June 2010. The train entered revenue service on 2 October 2010.

=== Formation ===
The two-car Resort View Furusato set is formed as follows.

Car	1	2
Numbering	HB-E302	HB-E301
Seating capacity	44	34
Weight (t)	40.5	41.5

== 2-car Resort Asunaro ==
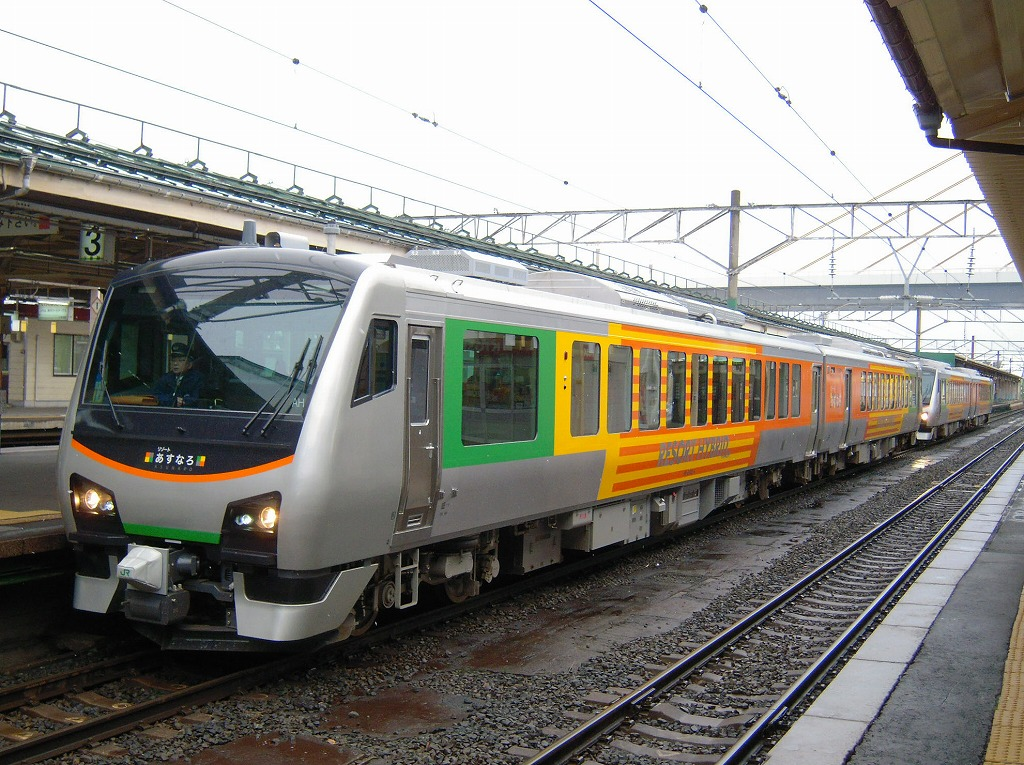
The two-car Resort Asunaro sets at Aomori Station in December 2010

The two 2-car trains for the Tsugaru and Ōminato Lines are branded Resort Asunaro (リゾートあすなろ), named after Aomori's prefectural tree, known as Asunaro in Japanese. They were built by Niigata Transys and were delivered to JR East's Aomori Depot in September 2010, entering service from 4 December 2010, coinciding with the opening of the Tōhoku Shinkansen extension to Shin-Aomori.

=== Formation ===
The two-car Resort Asunaro sets are formed as follows.

Car	1	2
Numbering	HB-E302	HB-E301
Seating capacity	44	34
Weight (t)	40.3	41.3

=== Interior ===
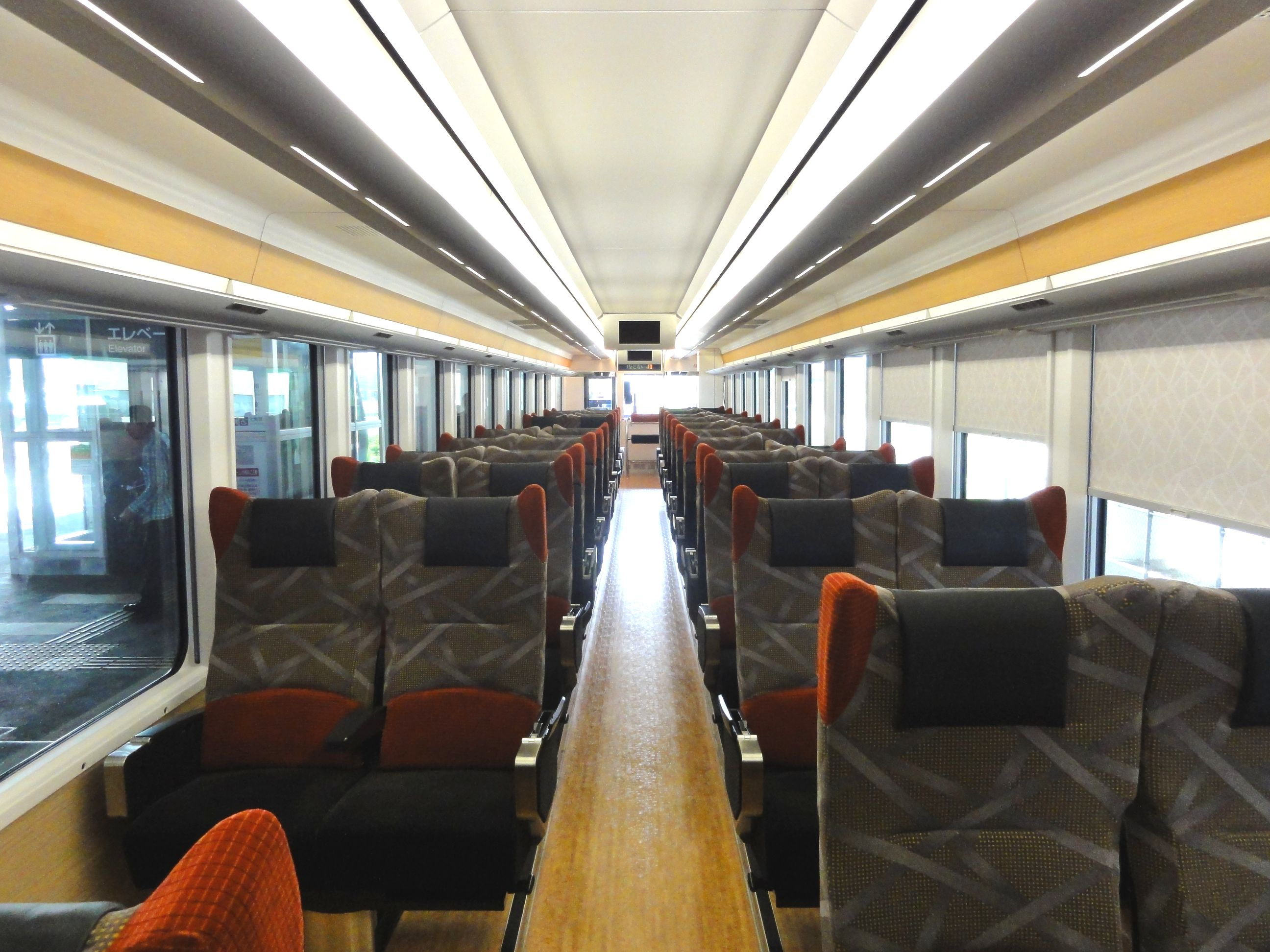
View of main saloon area of HB-E302-3 in June 2011

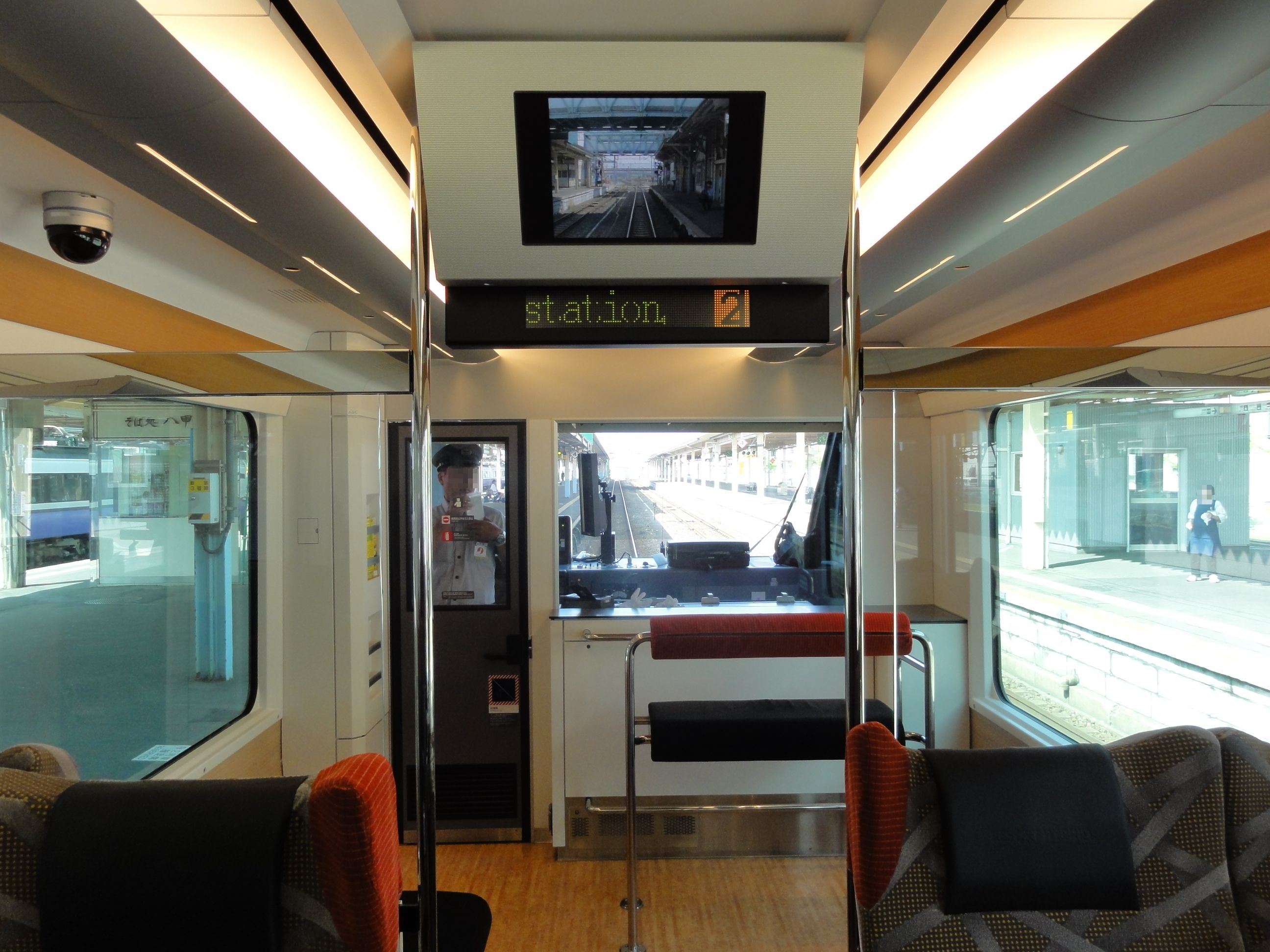
Interior view of HB-E301-3, showing ceiling-mounted monitor screens in June 2011

=== Withdrawal and conversions ===
In November 2022, JR East announced that the Resort Asunaro sets would be remodelled for two new sightseeing trains: Hinabi (ひなび) and Satono (さとの; stylized in all uppercase). The Hinabi set is scheduled to enter service in the final quarter of 2023, and the Satono set is scheduled to enter service in the first quarter of 2024.

JR East announced on 1 June 2023 that these sets would make their final trips in revenue service on 20 August of that year, ahead of their remodels.

== 4-car Resort Shirakami – Aoike ==
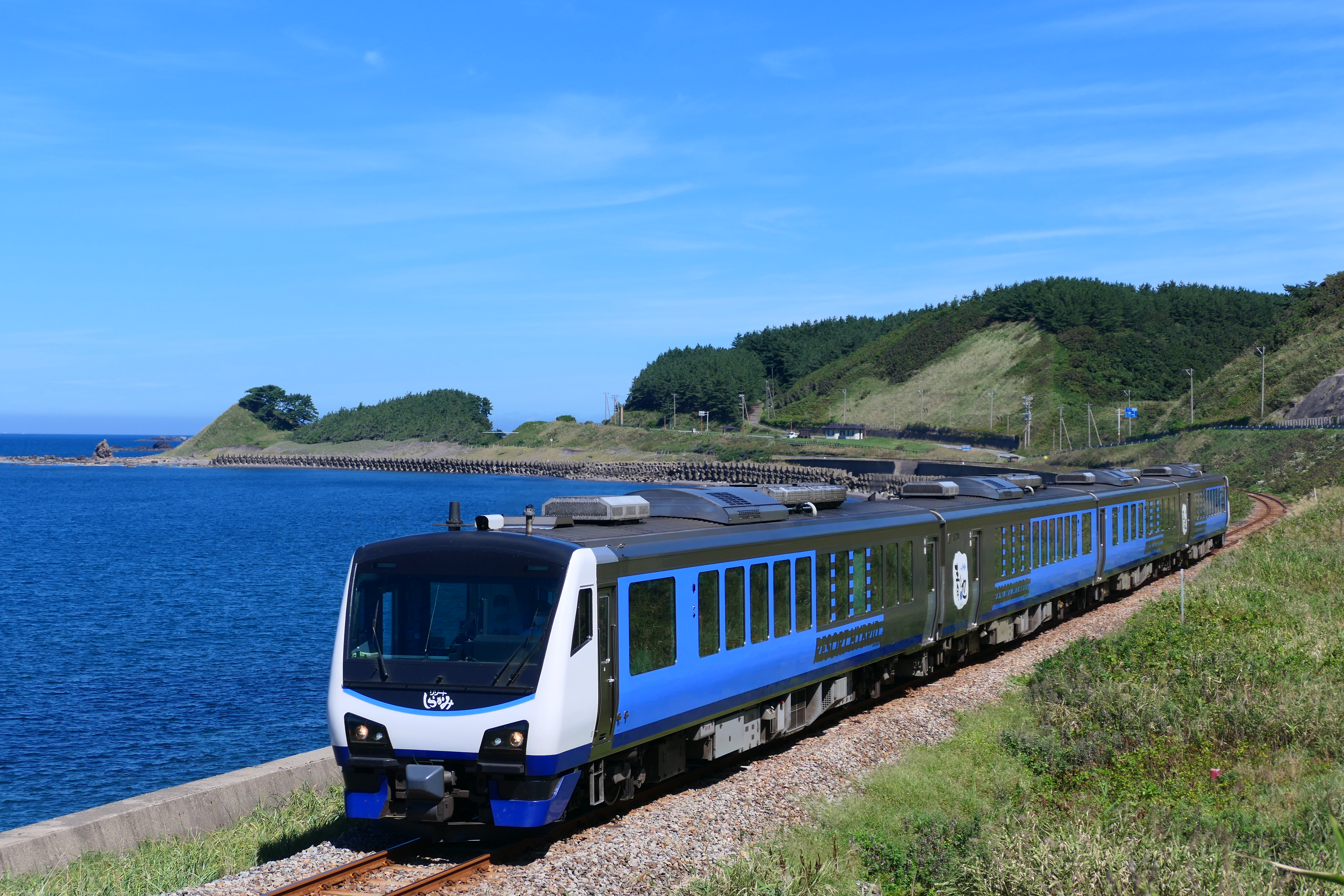
The four-car Resort Shirakami – Aoike set on the Gono Line in September 2020

The four-car Resort Shirakami – Aoike train for use on the Gono Line was delivered from Tokyu Car's Yokohama factory to JR East's Akita Depot in September 2010. It entered service from 4 December 2010.

=== Formation ===
The four-car Resort Shirakami – Aoike set is formed as follows.

Car	1	2	3	4
Numbering	HB-E301-1	HB-E300-101	HB-E300-1	HB-E302-1
Seating capacity	34	36	40	44
Weight (t)	41.3	41.5	40.0	40.3

== 4-car Resort Shirakami – Buna ==
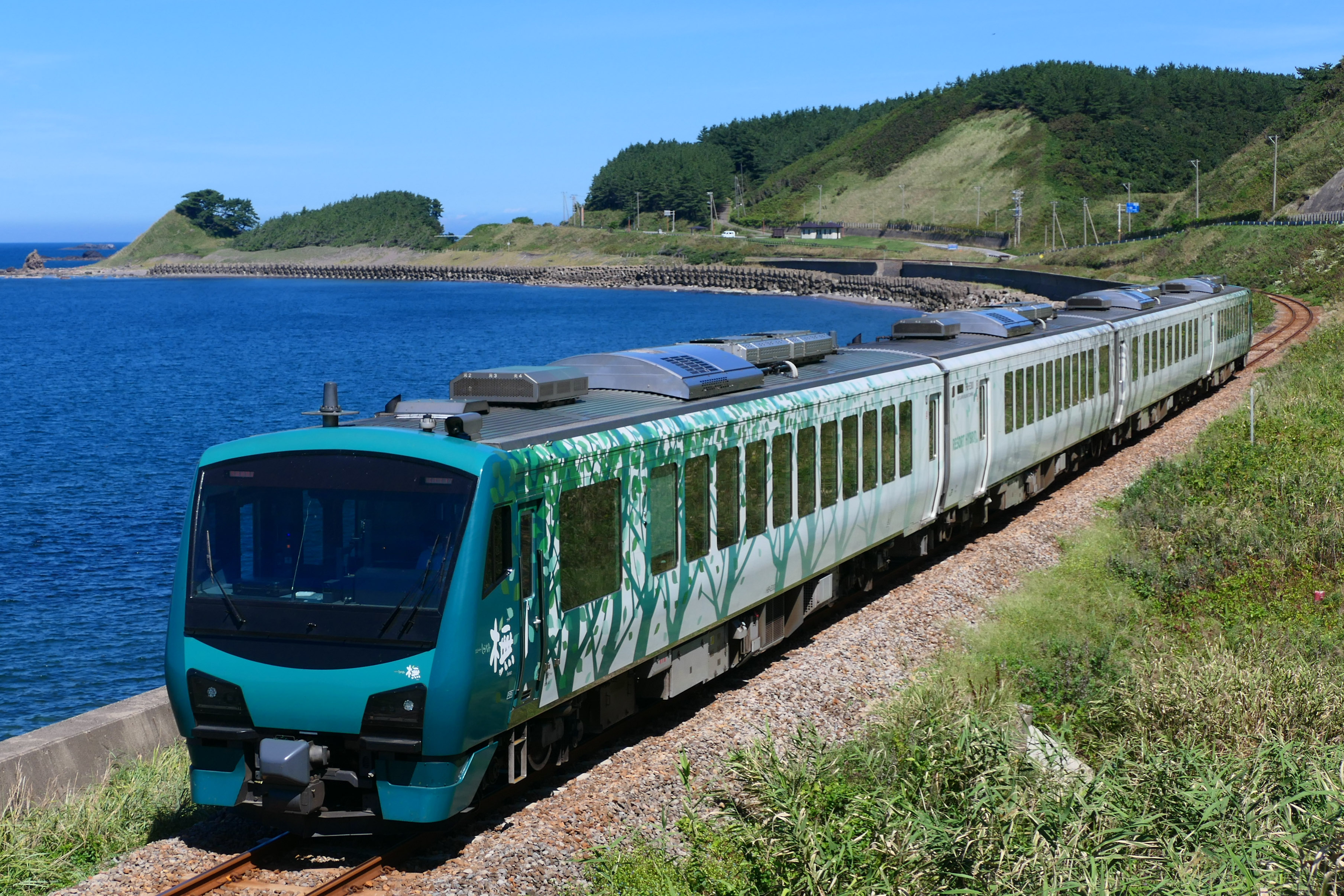
The four-car Resort Shirakami – Buna set on the Gono Line in September 2020

The four-car Resort Shirakami - Buna train for use on the Gono Line was built jointly by J-TREC (cars 1, 2, and 4) at its Yokohama factory and JR East's Akita Works (car 3) in 2016. The train entered service on 16 July 2016, replacing the earlier KiHa 48 four-car DMU trainset previously used. The exterior livery and interior design of this set was overseen by Ken Okuyama Design.

=== Formation ===
The four-car Resort Shirakami – Buna set is formed as follows with car 1 at the Akita/Aomori end.

Car	1	2	3	4
Numbering	HB-E301-5	HB-E300-105	HB-E300-5	HB-E302-5
Seating capacity	34	36	28	44

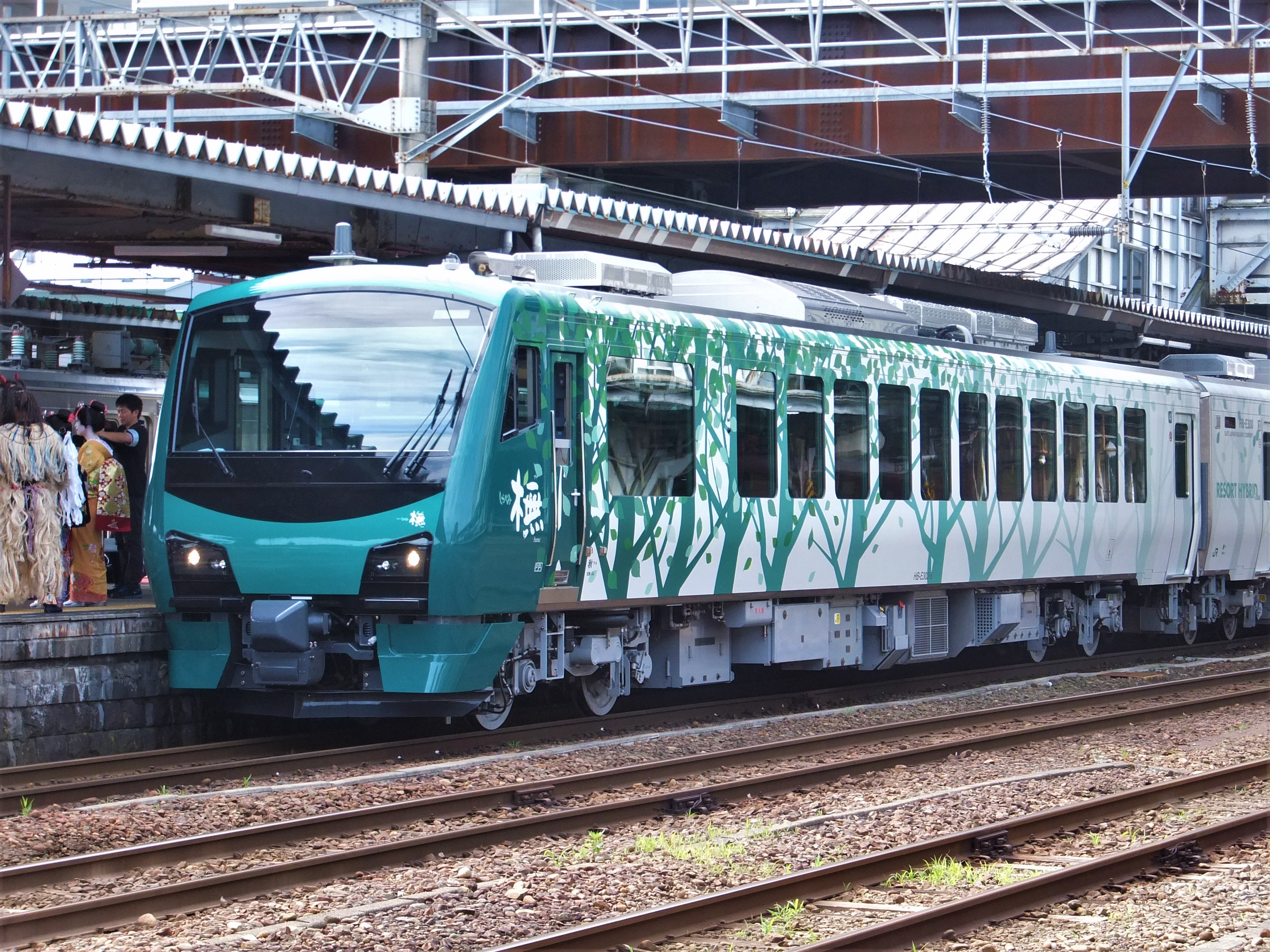
HB-E302-5 (car 1)

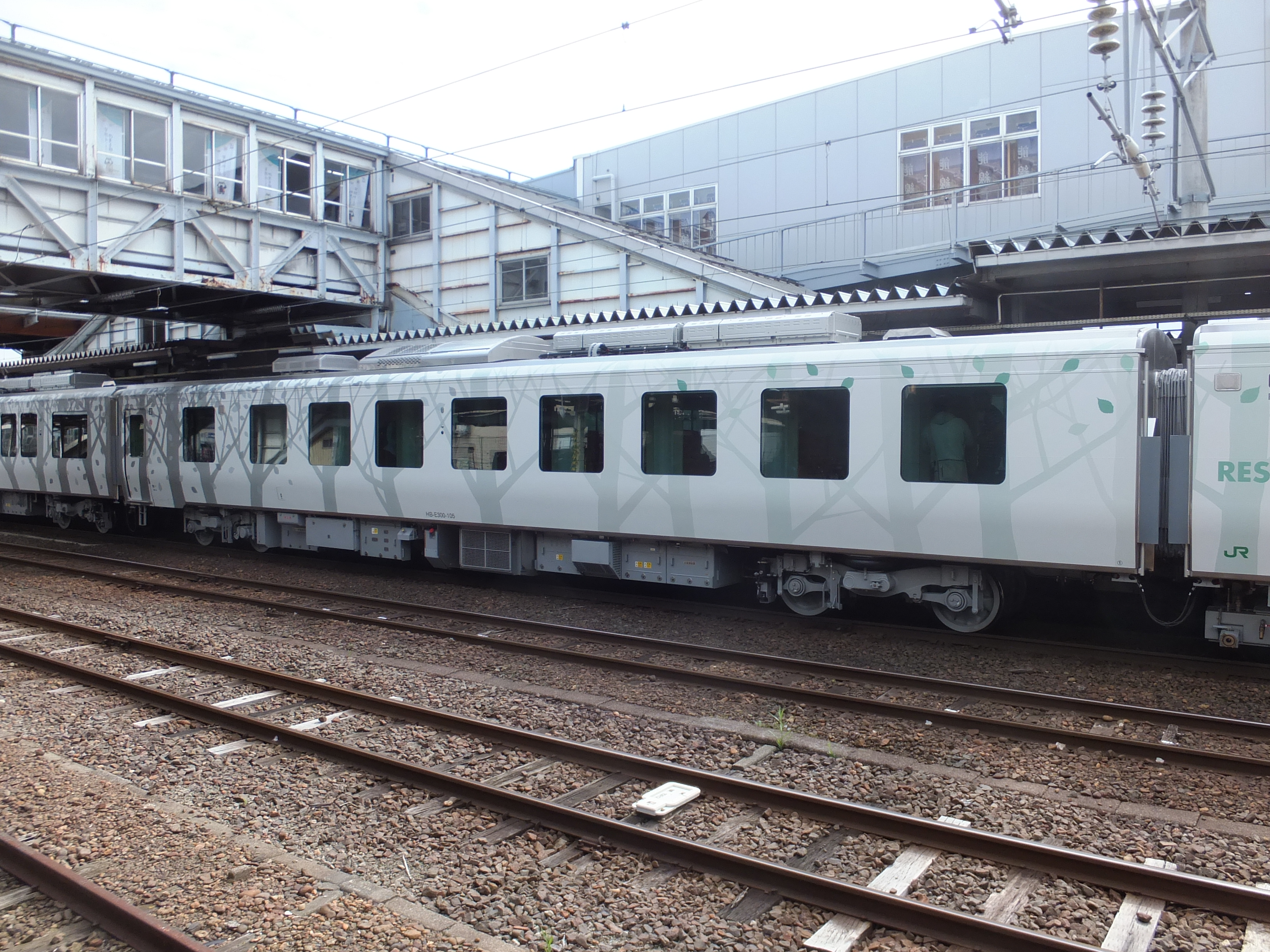
HB-E300-105 (car 2)

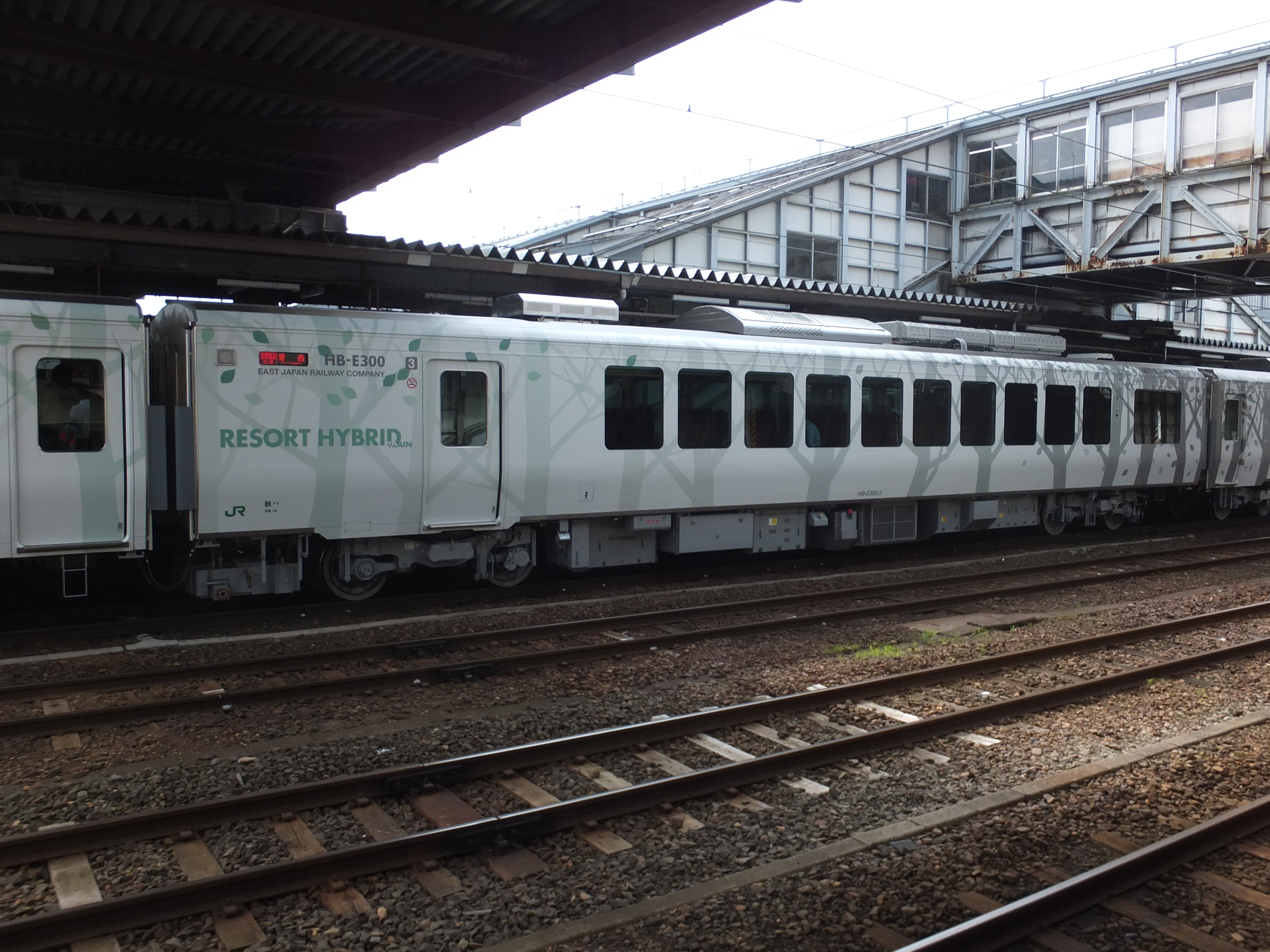
HB-E300-5 (car 3)

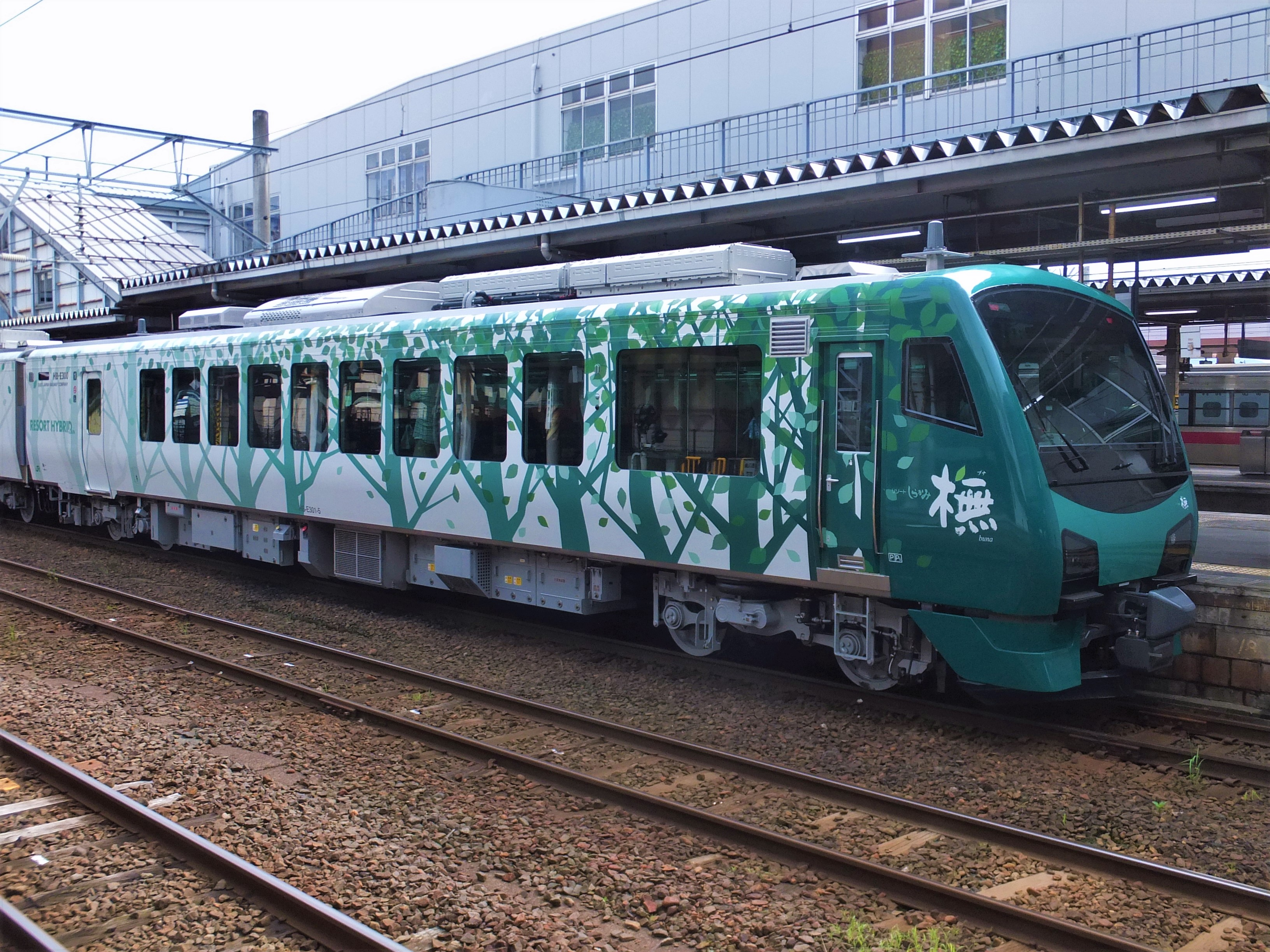
HB-E301-5 (car 4)

== 4-car Kairi ==
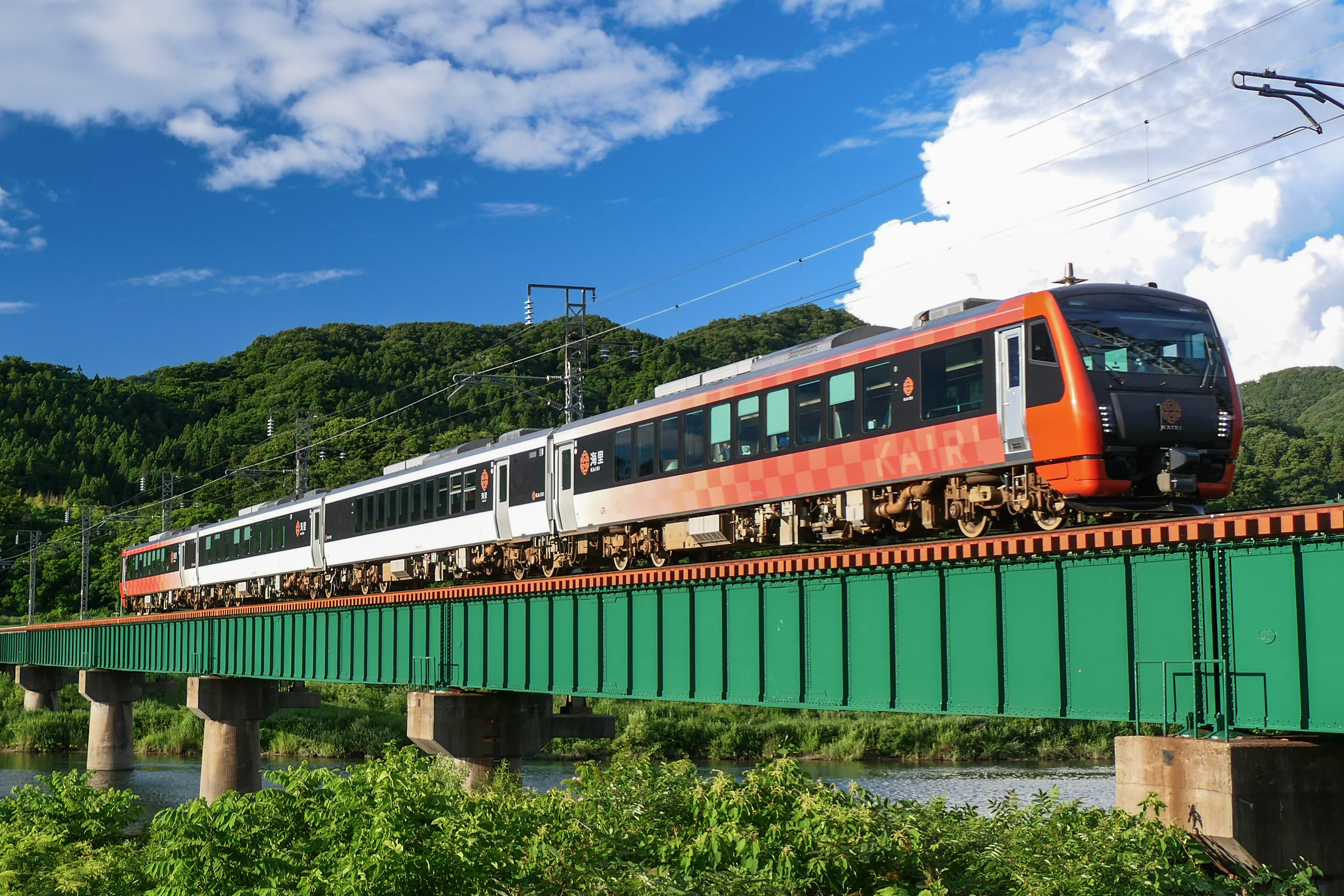
The four-car Kairi set in July 2022

The four-car Kairi (海里) train was announced by JR East in October 2018, developed around the cuisine of Niigata and Shonai, as well as the scenery of the Sea of Japan. Intended to operate between Niigata and Sakata stations on Fridays, Saturdays, and holidays, the exterior features an orange-and-white colour scheme, inspired by sunset and snow. The set features a different headlight design than older HB-E300 series sets. It was built by Niigata Transys in 2019, and entered revenue service on 5 October 2019.

=== Formation ===
The Kairi set is formed as follows, with car 1 at the Sakata end.

Car	1	2	3	4
Numbering	HB-E301-6	HB-E300-106	HB-E300-6	HB-E302-6
Seating capacity	30	32	—N/a	24
Accommodation		Compartments	Event space	Dining, observation

=== Interior ===
Each car features different internal facilities. Cars 1 and 3 are equipped with toilets.

- Car 1 features 2+2 abreast reclining seating throughout; the seats are rotated approximately three degrees toward the windows.
- Car 2 is a compartment car, featuring eight semi-private compartments with four seats each, as well as a luggage compartment.
- Car 3 does not feature passenger accommodation; it features a service counter and a space for events.
- Car 4 is a dining car and features three sets of four-person seating bays, four sets of two-person seating bays, and two sets of two-person bench seats.
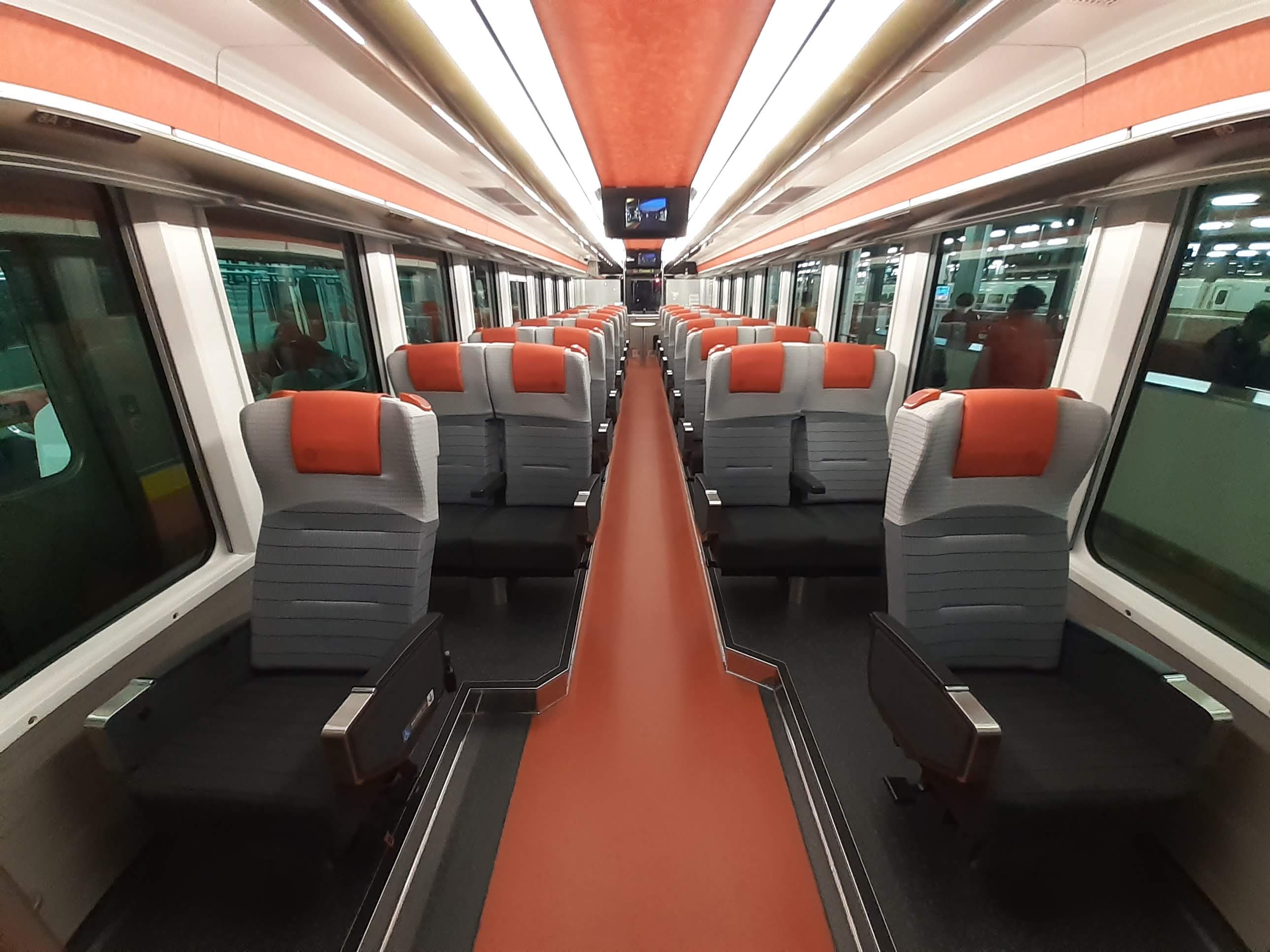
Open seating (car 1)

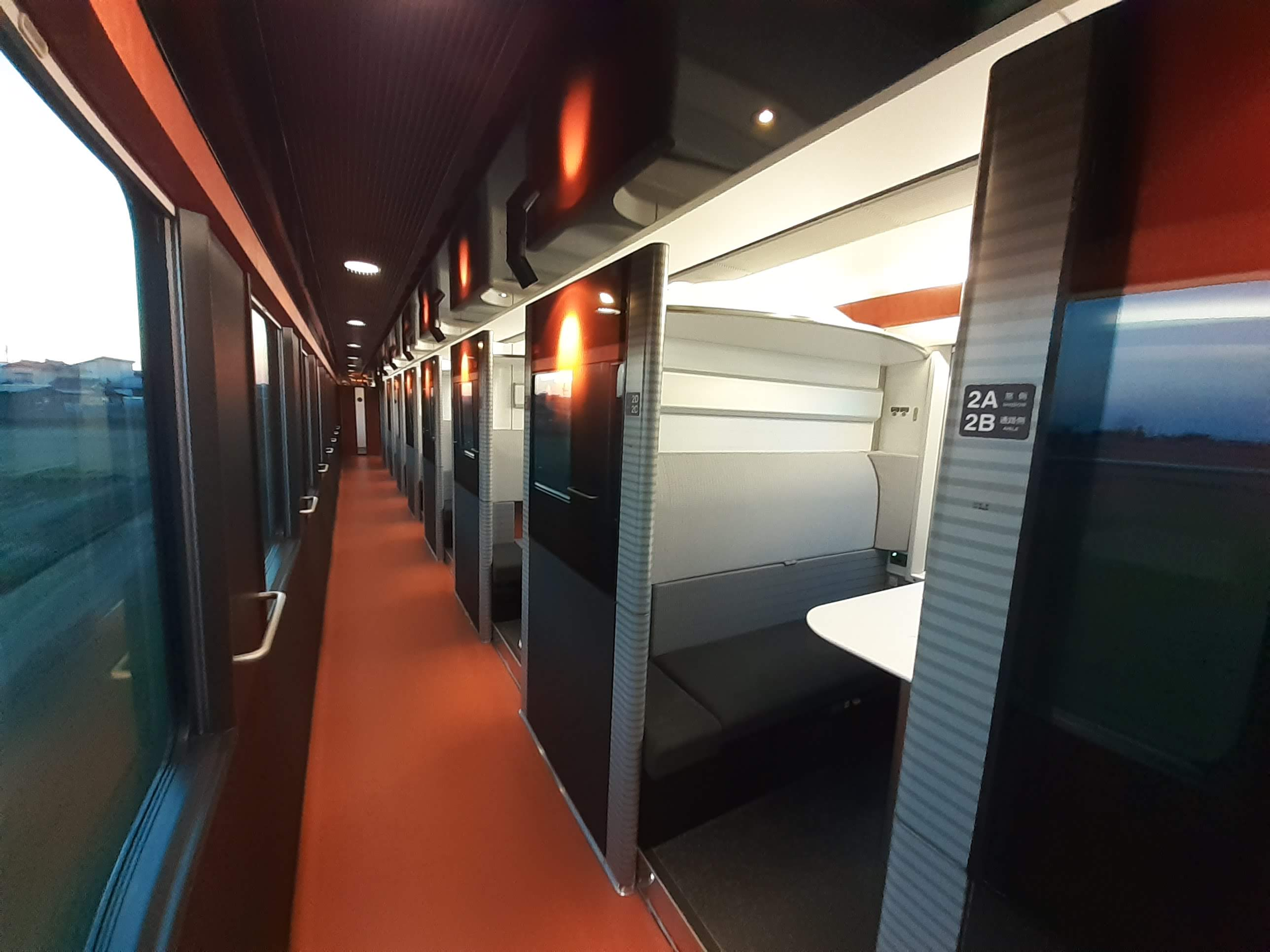
Compartmentalized seating (car 2)

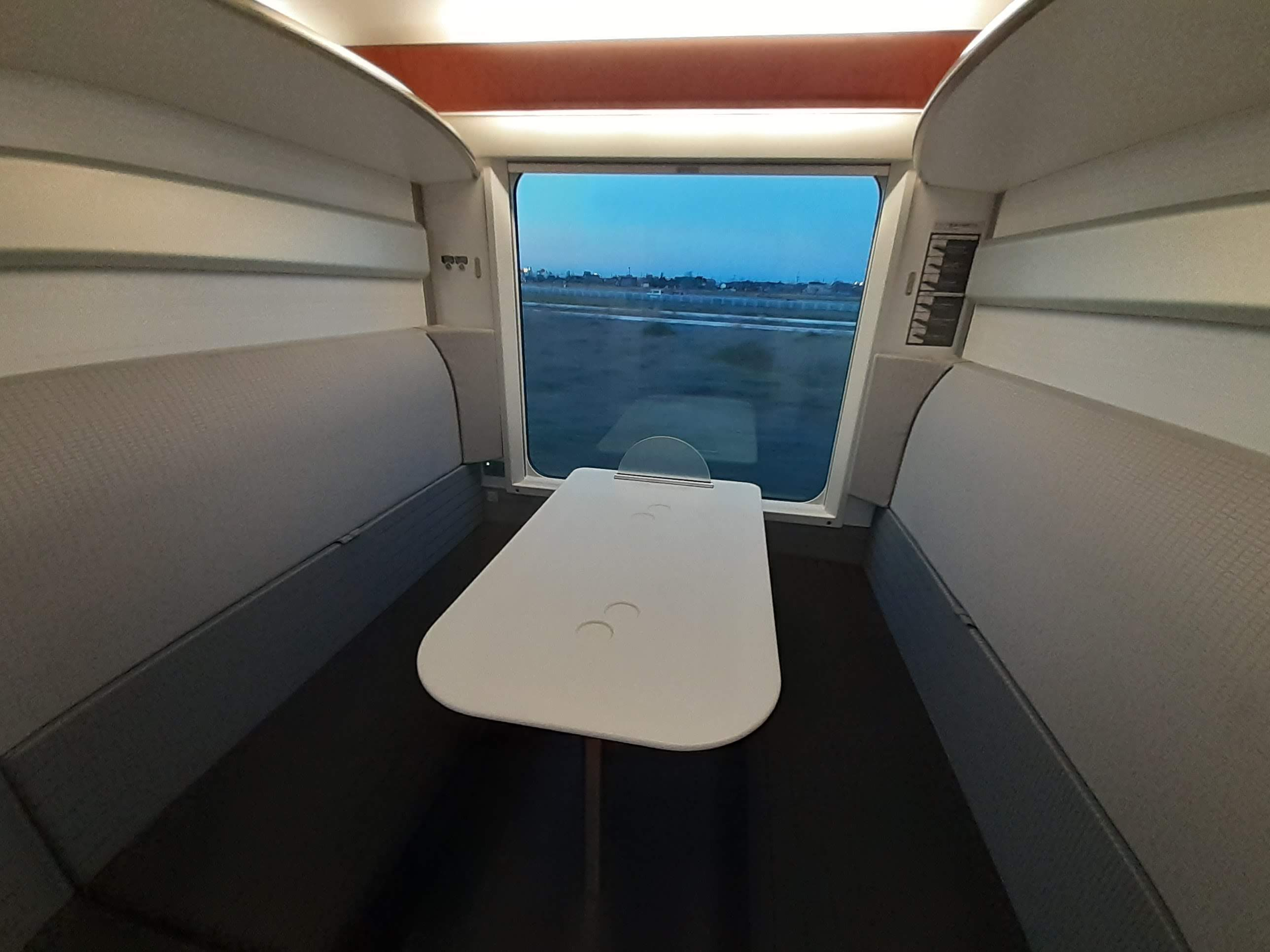
Seating compartment

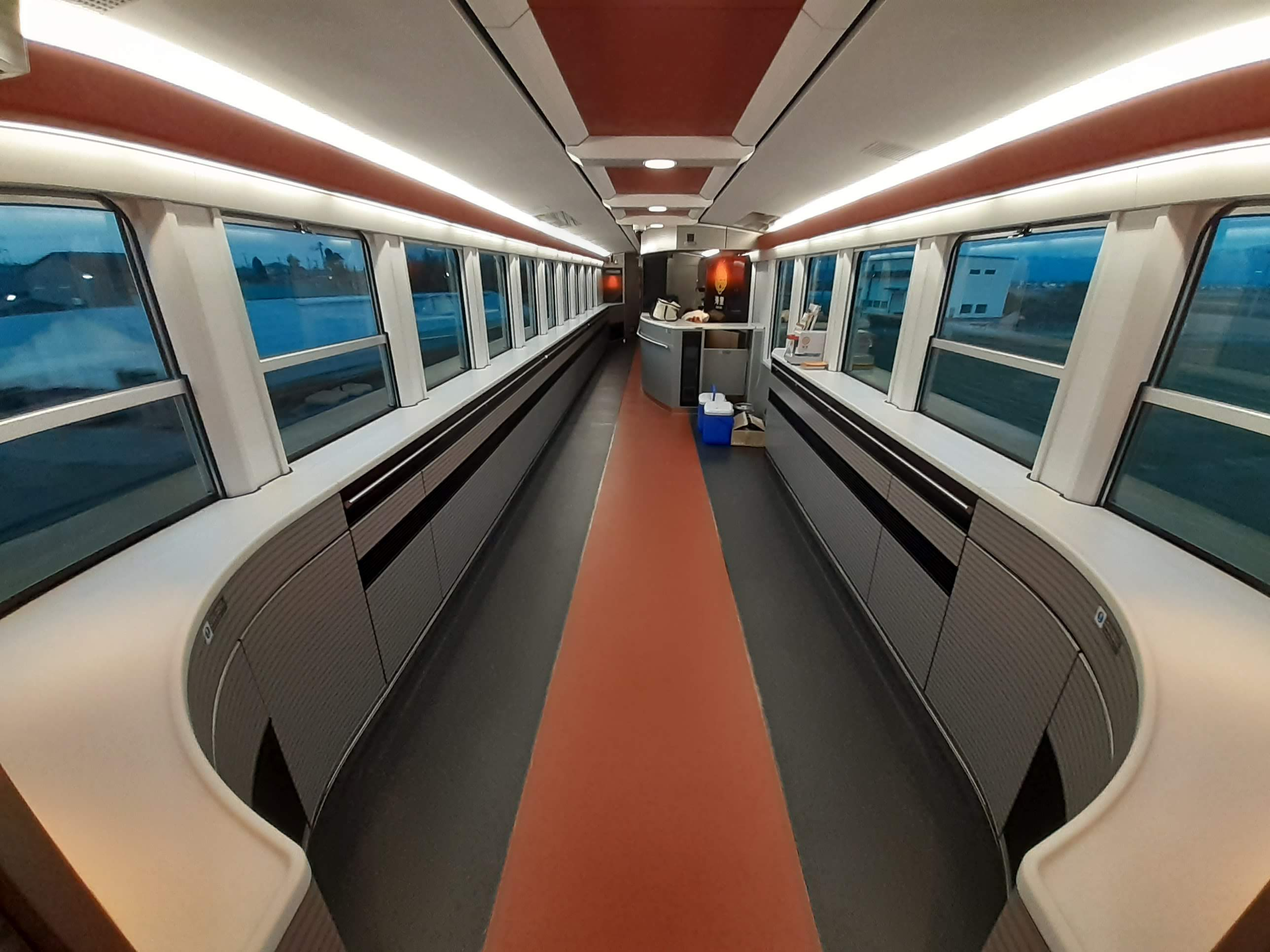
Service counter (car 3)

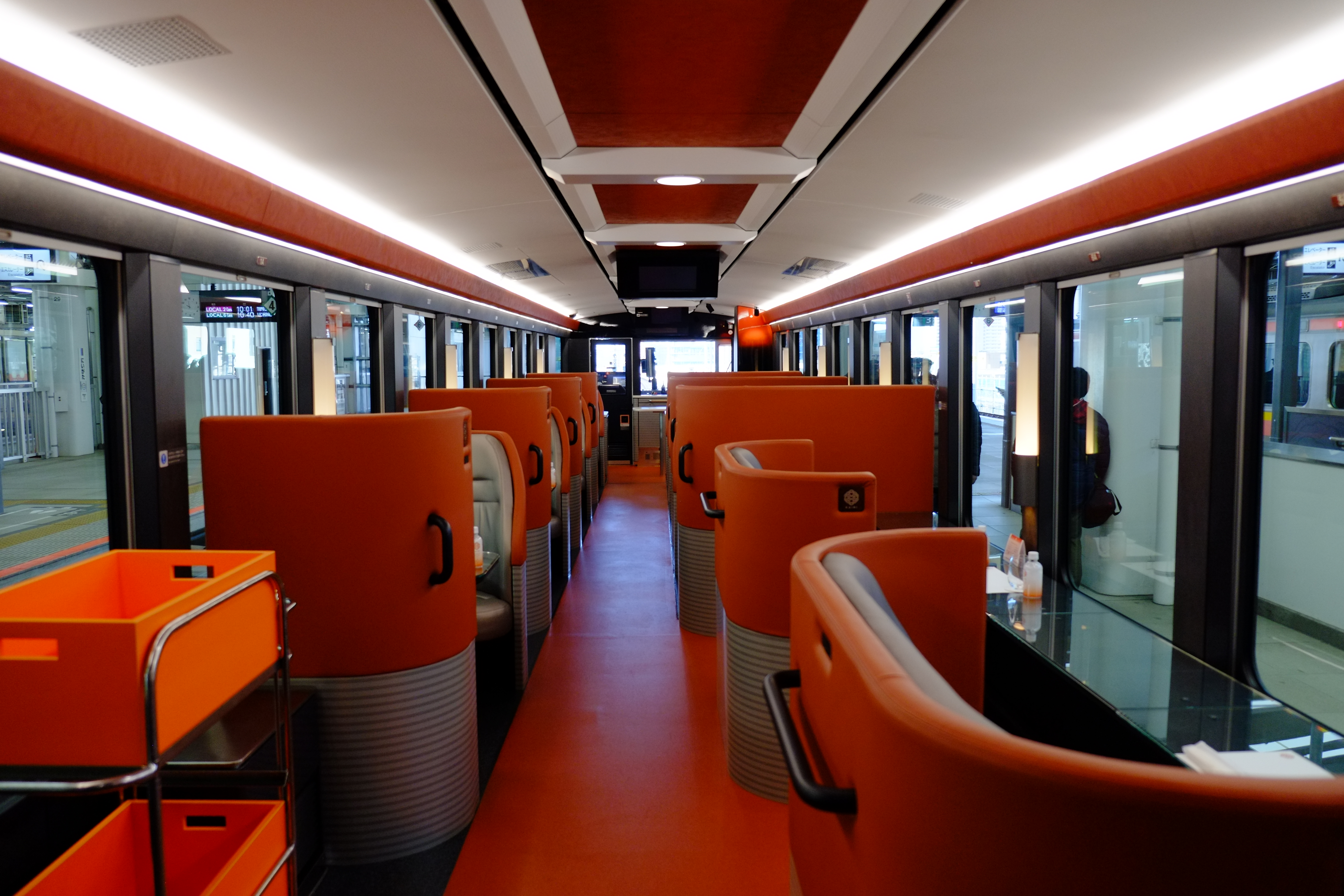
Diner (car 4)

== 2-car Hinabi ==
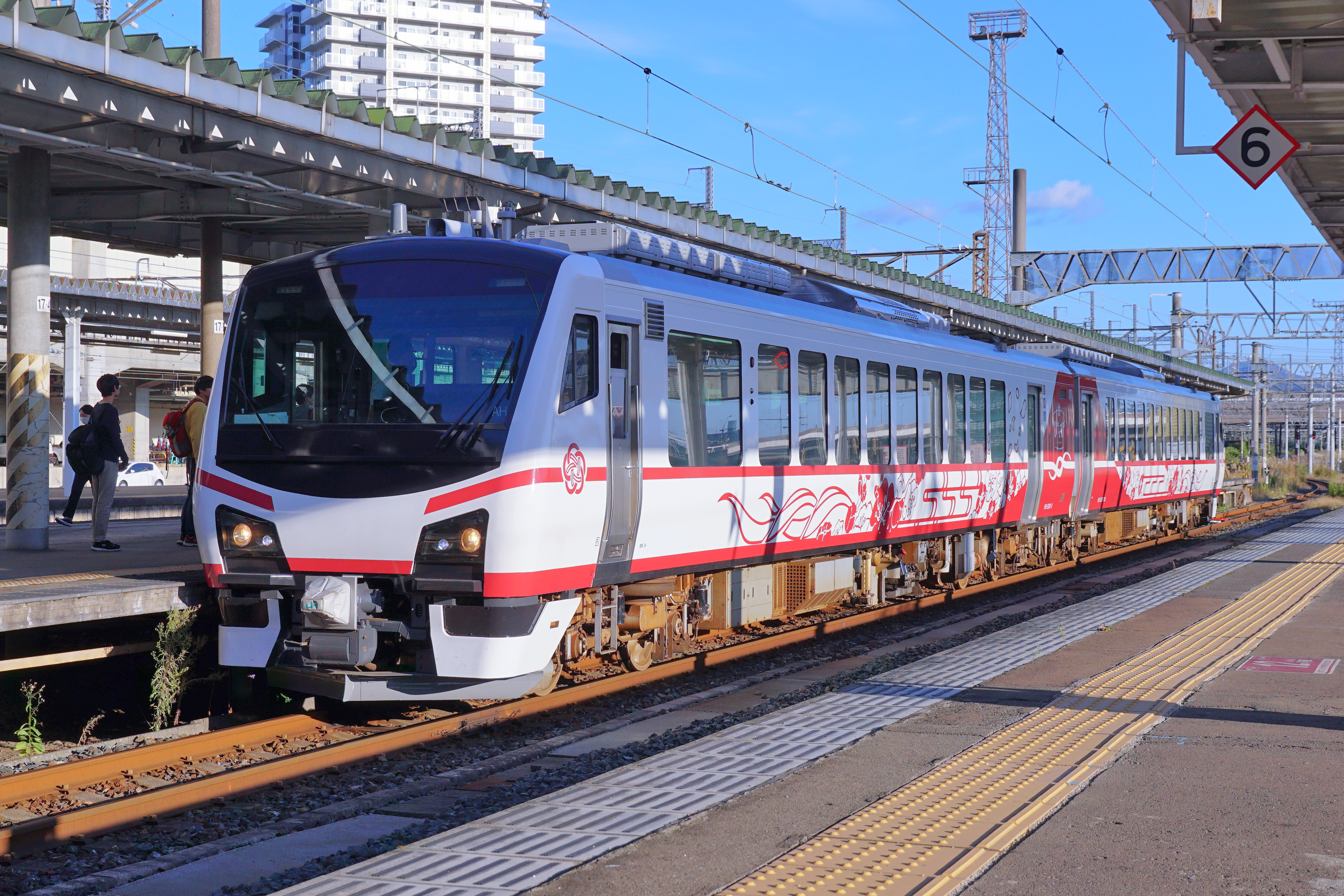
The Hinabi set in October 2023

The two-car Hinabi (ひなび) train for use in Iwate and Aomori was announced by JR East in November 2022. Formerly a Resort Asunaro set, the Hinabi set carries a red-on-white livery inspired by the mountains and rivers. It entered revenue service on 23 December 2023.

=== Interior ===
Car 1 is a "Green car" and consists of semi-compartment seating bays. Car 2 is a standard-class car and consists of 2+2 abreast reclining seating throughout.

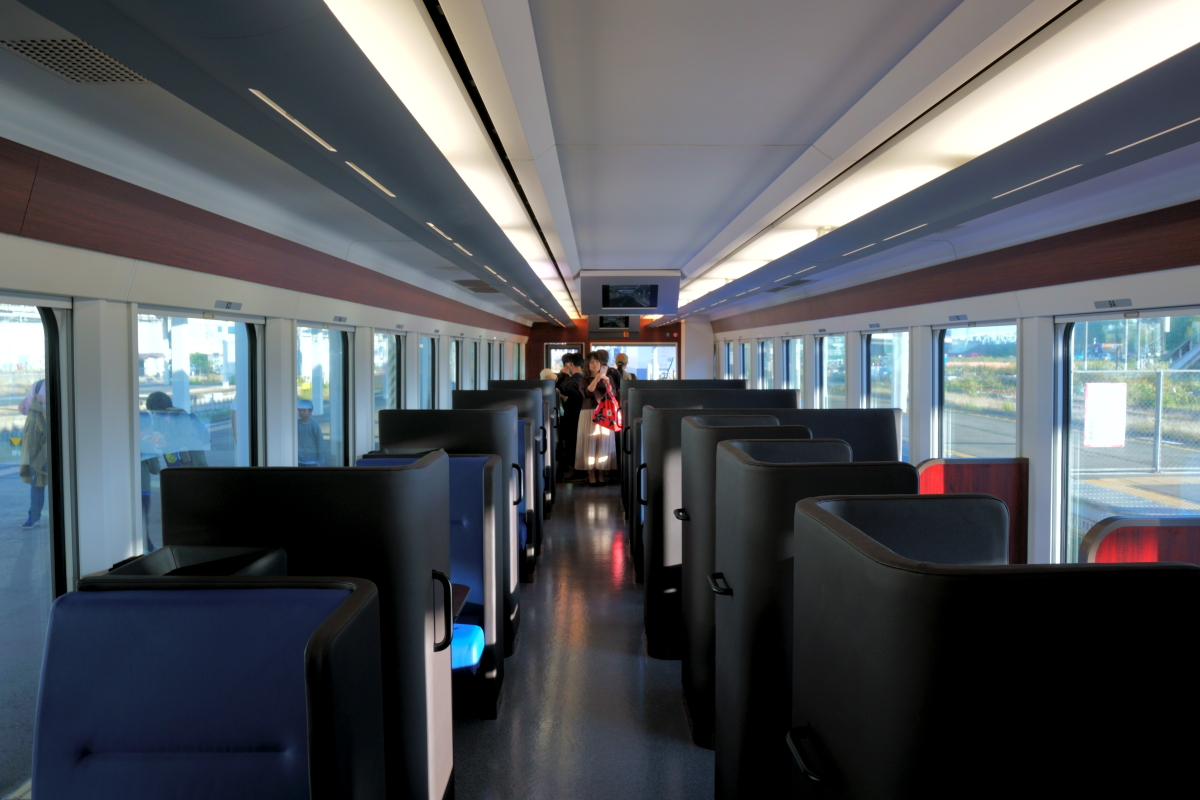
Interior (car 1)

== 2-car Satono ==
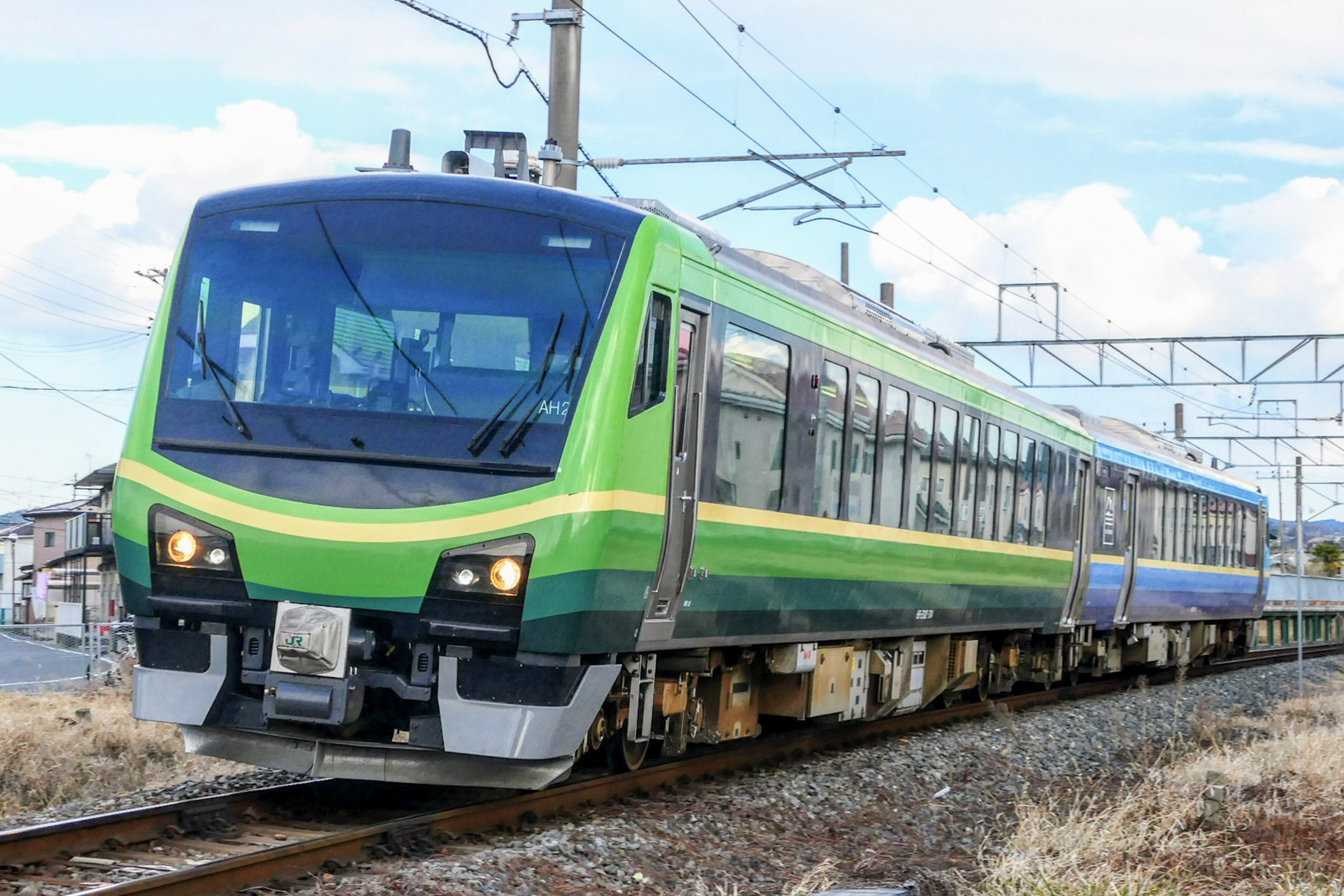
The two-car Satono set in January 2025

Set AH2, a former Resort Asunaro set, was converted to become the two-car Satono (さとの) train for use in the Fukushima, Miyagi and Yamagata areas. The set entered revenue service on 6 April 2024 on the Ban'etsu West Line. Car 1 carries a green livery inspired by the lush green mountains and rice fields in the Tohoku region while Car 2 carries a blue livery inspired by the pure water, clear air and deep sea.

=== Interior ===
Car 1 is a "Green car" with a capacity of 25 passengers that consists of semi-compartment seating bays and three single seats. Car 2 is a standard-class car and consists of 32 reclining seats arranged in a 2+2 configuration and two single reclining seats.
